

575001–575100 

|-bgcolor=#E9E9E9
| 575001 ||  || — || March 11, 2011 || Kitt Peak || Spacewatch ||  || align=right | 1.8 km || 
|-id=002 bgcolor=#d6d6d6
| 575002 ||  || — || March 6, 2011 || Kitt Peak || Spacewatch ||  || align=right | 1.7 km || 
|-id=003 bgcolor=#E9E9E9
| 575003 ||  || — || March 9, 2002 || Kitt Peak || Spacewatch ||  || align=right | 1.4 km || 
|-id=004 bgcolor=#E9E9E9
| 575004 ||  || — || March 11, 2011 || Mount Lemmon || Mount Lemmon Survey ||  || align=right | 1.5 km || 
|-id=005 bgcolor=#E9E9E9
| 575005 ||  || — || March 2, 2011 || Mount Lemmon || Mount Lemmon Survey ||  || align=right | 1.4 km || 
|-id=006 bgcolor=#E9E9E9
| 575006 ||  || — || March 4, 2011 || Mount Lemmon || Mount Lemmon Survey ||  || align=right | 1.3 km || 
|-id=007 bgcolor=#E9E9E9
| 575007 ||  || — || March 2, 2011 || Kitt Peak || Spacewatch ||  || align=right | 1.2 km || 
|-id=008 bgcolor=#E9E9E9
| 575008 ||  || — || March 9, 2011 || Mount Lemmon || Mount Lemmon Survey ||  || align=right | 1.8 km || 
|-id=009 bgcolor=#E9E9E9
| 575009 ||  || — || April 9, 2002 || Socorro || LINEAR ||  || align=right | 2.2 km || 
|-id=010 bgcolor=#E9E9E9
| 575010 ||  || — || March 24, 2011 || Kitt Peak || Spacewatch ||  || align=right | 1.1 km || 
|-id=011 bgcolor=#fefefe
| 575011 ||  || — || February 10, 2011 || Mount Lemmon || Mount Lemmon Survey ||  || align=right data-sort-value="0.94" | 940 m || 
|-id=012 bgcolor=#E9E9E9
| 575012 ||  || — || March 29, 2011 || Mount Lemmon || Mount Lemmon Survey ||  || align=right | 2.1 km || 
|-id=013 bgcolor=#E9E9E9
| 575013 ||  || — || May 9, 2002 || Palomar || NEAT ||  || align=right | 3.2 km || 
|-id=014 bgcolor=#fefefe
| 575014 ||  || — || March 29, 2011 || Piszkesteto || Z. Kuli, K. Sárneczky ||  || align=right data-sort-value="0.82" | 820 m || 
|-id=015 bgcolor=#E9E9E9
| 575015 ||  || — || March 29, 2011 || Piszkesteto || Z. Kuli, K. Sárneczky ||  || align=right | 1.6 km || 
|-id=016 bgcolor=#E9E9E9
| 575016 ||  || — || May 30, 2002 || Palomar || NEAT ||  || align=right | 2.6 km || 
|-id=017 bgcolor=#E9E9E9
| 575017 ||  || — || March 11, 2011 || Kitt Peak || Spacewatch ||  || align=right | 1.8 km || 
|-id=018 bgcolor=#E9E9E9
| 575018 ||  || — || March 29, 2011 || Kitt Peak || Spacewatch ||  || align=right | 1.6 km || 
|-id=019 bgcolor=#E9E9E9
| 575019 ||  || — || March 26, 2011 || Mount Lemmon || Mount Lemmon Survey ||  || align=right | 2.4 km || 
|-id=020 bgcolor=#fefefe
| 575020 ||  || — || November 3, 2005 || Mount Lemmon || Mount Lemmon Survey ||  || align=right data-sort-value="0.80" | 800 m || 
|-id=021 bgcolor=#E9E9E9
| 575021 ||  || — || March 29, 2011 || Mount Lemmon || Mount Lemmon Survey ||  || align=right | 1.8 km || 
|-id=022 bgcolor=#E9E9E9
| 575022 ||  || — || October 8, 2004 || Anderson Mesa || LONEOS || HNS || align=right | 1.6 km || 
|-id=023 bgcolor=#E9E9E9
| 575023 ||  || — || October 15, 2004 || Mount Lemmon || Mount Lemmon Survey ||  || align=right | 2.0 km || 
|-id=024 bgcolor=#E9E9E9
| 575024 ||  || — || March 30, 2011 || Mount Lemmon || Mount Lemmon Survey ||  || align=right | 1.5 km || 
|-id=025 bgcolor=#E9E9E9
| 575025 ||  || — || September 4, 2008 || Kitt Peak || Spacewatch ||  || align=right | 1.6 km || 
|-id=026 bgcolor=#fefefe
| 575026 ||  || — || April 17, 2005 || Kitt Peak || Spacewatch ||  || align=right data-sort-value="0.49" | 490 m || 
|-id=027 bgcolor=#E9E9E9
| 575027 ||  || — || April 25, 2007 || Kitt Peak || Spacewatch ||  || align=right | 1.8 km || 
|-id=028 bgcolor=#E9E9E9
| 575028 ||  || — || March 1, 2011 || Mount Lemmon || Mount Lemmon Survey ||  || align=right | 1.5 km || 
|-id=029 bgcolor=#E9E9E9
| 575029 ||  || — || September 21, 2009 || Mount Lemmon || Mount Lemmon Survey ||  || align=right | 1.8 km || 
|-id=030 bgcolor=#E9E9E9
| 575030 ||  || — || March 14, 2011 || Mount Lemmon || Mount Lemmon Survey ||  || align=right | 1.8 km || 
|-id=031 bgcolor=#E9E9E9
| 575031 ||  || — || February 10, 2011 || Mount Lemmon || Mount Lemmon Survey ||  || align=right | 1.7 km || 
|-id=032 bgcolor=#E9E9E9
| 575032 ||  || — || March 6, 2011 || Mount Lemmon || Mount Lemmon Survey ||  || align=right | 1.3 km || 
|-id=033 bgcolor=#E9E9E9
| 575033 ||  || — || April 1, 2011 || Kitt Peak || Spacewatch ||  || align=right | 1.3 km || 
|-id=034 bgcolor=#d6d6d6
| 575034 ||  || — || December 11, 2014 || Mount Lemmon || Mount Lemmon Survey ||  || align=right | 2.3 km || 
|-id=035 bgcolor=#E9E9E9
| 575035 ||  || — || April 5, 2011 || Mount Lemmon || Mount Lemmon Survey ||  || align=right | 1.7 km || 
|-id=036 bgcolor=#E9E9E9
| 575036 ||  || — || January 25, 2006 || Kitt Peak || Spacewatch ||  || align=right | 2.5 km || 
|-id=037 bgcolor=#E9E9E9
| 575037 ||  || — || November 28, 2013 || Haleakala || Pan-STARRS ||  || align=right | 1.2 km || 
|-id=038 bgcolor=#E9E9E9
| 575038 ||  || — || October 20, 2008 || Mount Lemmon || Mount Lemmon Survey ||  || align=right | 1.8 km || 
|-id=039 bgcolor=#E9E9E9
| 575039 ||  || — || September 4, 2008 || Kitt Peak || Spacewatch ||  || align=right | 2.0 km || 
|-id=040 bgcolor=#E9E9E9
| 575040 ||  || — || April 2, 2011 || Mount Lemmon || Mount Lemmon Survey ||  || align=right | 2.2 km || 
|-id=041 bgcolor=#E9E9E9
| 575041 ||  || — || April 2, 2011 || Mount Lemmon || Mount Lemmon Survey ||  || align=right | 1.3 km || 
|-id=042 bgcolor=#E9E9E9
| 575042 ||  || — || April 2, 2011 || Mount Lemmon || Mount Lemmon Survey ||  || align=right | 1.5 km || 
|-id=043 bgcolor=#E9E9E9
| 575043 ||  || — || October 23, 2009 || Kitt Peak || Spacewatch ||  || align=right | 1.4 km || 
|-id=044 bgcolor=#E9E9E9
| 575044 ||  || — || April 6, 2011 || Mount Lemmon || Mount Lemmon Survey ||  || align=right | 2.0 km || 
|-id=045 bgcolor=#E9E9E9
| 575045 ||  || — || April 6, 2011 || Mount Lemmon || Mount Lemmon Survey ||  || align=right | 1.6 km || 
|-id=046 bgcolor=#E9E9E9
| 575046 ||  || — || December 20, 2009 || Mount Lemmon || Mount Lemmon Survey ||  || align=right | 1.2 km || 
|-id=047 bgcolor=#E9E9E9
| 575047 ||  || — || January 28, 2011 || Kitt Peak || Spacewatch ||  || align=right | 2.1 km || 
|-id=048 bgcolor=#E9E9E9
| 575048 ||  || — || May 11, 2007 || Mount Lemmon || Mount Lemmon Survey ||  || align=right | 2.1 km || 
|-id=049 bgcolor=#E9E9E9
| 575049 ||  || — || March 28, 2011 || Mount Lemmon || Mount Lemmon Survey ||  || align=right | 1.4 km || 
|-id=050 bgcolor=#E9E9E9
| 575050 ||  || — || September 3, 2008 || Kitt Peak || Spacewatch ||  || align=right | 1.9 km || 
|-id=051 bgcolor=#E9E9E9
| 575051 ||  || — || March 14, 2011 || Mount Lemmon || Mount Lemmon Survey ||  || align=right data-sort-value="0.92" | 920 m || 
|-id=052 bgcolor=#E9E9E9
| 575052 ||  || — || August 21, 2008 || Kitt Peak || Spacewatch ||  || align=right | 2.1 km || 
|-id=053 bgcolor=#E9E9E9
| 575053 ||  || — || February 10, 2011 || Mount Lemmon || Mount Lemmon Survey ||  || align=right | 2.0 km || 
|-id=054 bgcolor=#E9E9E9
| 575054 ||  || — || March 12, 2002 || Palomar || NEAT ||  || align=right | 1.7 km || 
|-id=055 bgcolor=#E9E9E9
| 575055 ||  || — || April 4, 2011 || Mount Lemmon || Mount Lemmon Survey ||  || align=right | 2.6 km || 
|-id=056 bgcolor=#E9E9E9
| 575056 ||  || — || August 20, 2004 || Kitt Peak || Spacewatch ||  || align=right | 1.7 km || 
|-id=057 bgcolor=#E9E9E9
| 575057 ||  || — || September 20, 2007 || Kitt Peak || Spacewatch ||  || align=right | 1.9 km || 
|-id=058 bgcolor=#E9E9E9
| 575058 ||  || — || October 7, 2004 || Anderson Mesa || LONEOS ||  || align=right | 2.2 km || 
|-id=059 bgcolor=#E9E9E9
| 575059 ||  || — || April 2, 2011 || Mount Lemmon || Mount Lemmon Survey ||  || align=right | 1.7 km || 
|-id=060 bgcolor=#d6d6d6
| 575060 ||  || — || March 25, 2011 || Kitt Peak || Spacewatch ||  || align=right | 2.1 km || 
|-id=061 bgcolor=#E9E9E9
| 575061 ||  || — || October 3, 2013 || Kitt Peak || Spacewatch ||  || align=right | 1.7 km || 
|-id=062 bgcolor=#E9E9E9
| 575062 ||  || — || October 5, 2013 || Kitt Peak || Spacewatch ||  || align=right | 1.5 km || 
|-id=063 bgcolor=#fefefe
| 575063 ||  || — || September 22, 2012 || Mount Lemmon || Mount Lemmon Survey ||  || align=right data-sort-value="0.75" | 750 m || 
|-id=064 bgcolor=#E9E9E9
| 575064 ||  || — || November 10, 2013 || Kitt Peak || Spacewatch ||  || align=right | 1.1 km || 
|-id=065 bgcolor=#E9E9E9
| 575065 ||  || — || January 19, 2015 || Mount Lemmon || Mount Lemmon Survey ||  || align=right | 1.6 km || 
|-id=066 bgcolor=#fefefe
| 575066 ||  || — || September 18, 2012 || Mount Lemmon || Mount Lemmon Survey ||  || align=right data-sort-value="0.68" | 680 m || 
|-id=067 bgcolor=#E9E9E9
| 575067 ||  || — || March 29, 2011 || Mount Lemmon || Mount Lemmon Survey ||  || align=right | 2.0 km || 
|-id=068 bgcolor=#E9E9E9
| 575068 ||  || — || March 29, 2011 || Mount Lemmon || Mount Lemmon Survey ||  || align=right | 1.5 km || 
|-id=069 bgcolor=#E9E9E9
| 575069 ||  || — || March 25, 2011 || Haleakala || Pan-STARRS ||  || align=right | 1.7 km || 
|-id=070 bgcolor=#E9E9E9
| 575070 ||  || — || October 8, 2004 || Kitt Peak || Spacewatch ||  || align=right | 2.6 km || 
|-id=071 bgcolor=#E9E9E9
| 575071 ||  || — || March 18, 2002 || Haleakala || AMOS ||  || align=right | 2.9 km || 
|-id=072 bgcolor=#d6d6d6
| 575072 ||  || — || April 2, 2011 || Mount Lemmon || Mount Lemmon Survey ||  || align=right | 2.5 km || 
|-id=073 bgcolor=#E9E9E9
| 575073 ||  || — || November 17, 2009 || Kitt Peak || Spacewatch ||  || align=right | 1.2 km || 
|-id=074 bgcolor=#d6d6d6
| 575074 ||  || — || September 21, 2003 || Palomar || NEAT ||  || align=right | 2.0 km || 
|-id=075 bgcolor=#E9E9E9
| 575075 ||  || — || April 1, 2011 || Mount Lemmon || Mount Lemmon Survey ||  || align=right data-sort-value="0.79" | 790 m || 
|-id=076 bgcolor=#E9E9E9
| 575076 ||  || — || October 8, 2008 || Mount Lemmon || Mount Lemmon Survey ||  || align=right | 2.2 km || 
|-id=077 bgcolor=#d6d6d6
| 575077 ||  || — || April 4, 2011 || Mount Lemmon || Mount Lemmon Survey ||  || align=right | 2.8 km || 
|-id=078 bgcolor=#E9E9E9
| 575078 ||  || — || September 5, 2008 || Kitt Peak || Spacewatch ||  || align=right | 2.2 km || 
|-id=079 bgcolor=#E9E9E9
| 575079 ||  || — || September 5, 2008 || Kitt Peak || Spacewatch ||  || align=right | 1.9 km || 
|-id=080 bgcolor=#E9E9E9
| 575080 ||  || — || September 6, 2008 || Kitt Peak || Spacewatch ||  || align=right | 1.3 km || 
|-id=081 bgcolor=#E9E9E9
| 575081 ||  || — || May 14, 2002 || Kitt Peak || Spacewatch ||  || align=right | 2.5 km || 
|-id=082 bgcolor=#E9E9E9
| 575082 ||  || — || March 11, 2011 || Kitt Peak || Spacewatch ||  || align=right | 2.0 km || 
|-id=083 bgcolor=#E9E9E9
| 575083 ||  || — || April 2, 2011 || Mount Lemmon || Mount Lemmon Survey ||  || align=right | 2.9 km || 
|-id=084 bgcolor=#fefefe
| 575084 ||  || — || October 22, 2009 || Catalina || CSS || H || align=right data-sort-value="0.91" | 910 m || 
|-id=085 bgcolor=#E9E9E9
| 575085 ||  || — || April 13, 2011 || Mount Lemmon || Mount Lemmon Survey ||  || align=right | 2.2 km || 
|-id=086 bgcolor=#E9E9E9
| 575086 ||  || — || February 14, 2002 || Kitt Peak || Spacewatch ||  || align=right | 1.4 km || 
|-id=087 bgcolor=#E9E9E9
| 575087 ||  || — || March 26, 2011 || Mount Lemmon || Mount Lemmon Survey ||  || align=right | 1.7 km || 
|-id=088 bgcolor=#E9E9E9
| 575088 ||  || — || April 7, 2011 || Kitt Peak || Spacewatch ||  || align=right | 1.9 km || 
|-id=089 bgcolor=#E9E9E9
| 575089 ||  || — || April 3, 2011 || Haleakala || Pan-STARRS ||  || align=right | 1.5 km || 
|-id=090 bgcolor=#fefefe
| 575090 ||  || — || April 2, 2011 || Kitt Peak || Spacewatch ||  || align=right data-sort-value="0.54" | 540 m || 
|-id=091 bgcolor=#E9E9E9
| 575091 ||  || — || April 1, 2011 || Kitt Peak || Spacewatch ||  || align=right | 1.6 km || 
|-id=092 bgcolor=#E9E9E9
| 575092 ||  || — || April 29, 2016 || Mount Lemmon || Mount Lemmon Survey ||  || align=right | 2.1 km || 
|-id=093 bgcolor=#E9E9E9
| 575093 ||  || — || November 10, 2013 || Kitt Peak || Spacewatch ||  || align=right | 1.8 km || 
|-id=094 bgcolor=#d6d6d6
| 575094 ||  || — || April 11, 2011 || Mount Lemmon || Mount Lemmon Survey || 3:2 || align=right | 3.0 km || 
|-id=095 bgcolor=#E9E9E9
| 575095 ||  || — || January 22, 2015 || Haleakala || Pan-STARRS ||  || align=right data-sort-value="0.78" | 780 m || 
|-id=096 bgcolor=#E9E9E9
| 575096 ||  || — || April 6, 2011 || Mount Lemmon || Mount Lemmon Survey ||  || align=right | 1.8 km || 
|-id=097 bgcolor=#E9E9E9
| 575097 ||  || — || November 10, 2013 || Nogales || M. Schwartz, P. R. Holvorcem ||  || align=right | 1.1 km || 
|-id=098 bgcolor=#fefefe
| 575098 ||  || — || September 8, 2016 || Haleakala || Pan-STARRS ||  || align=right data-sort-value="0.75" | 750 m || 
|-id=099 bgcolor=#E9E9E9
| 575099 ||  || — || April 14, 2011 || Mount Lemmon || Mount Lemmon Survey ||  || align=right | 2.0 km || 
|-id=100 bgcolor=#d6d6d6
| 575100 ||  || — || April 6, 2011 || Mount Lemmon || Mount Lemmon Survey ||  || align=right | 2.0 km || 
|}

575101–575200 

|-bgcolor=#d6d6d6
| 575101 ||  || — || September 27, 2003 || Apache Point || SDSS Collaboration ||  || align=right | 2.4 km || 
|-id=102 bgcolor=#E9E9E9
| 575102 ||  || — || April 24, 2011 || Kitt Peak || Spacewatch ||  || align=right | 2.0 km || 
|-id=103 bgcolor=#E9E9E9
| 575103 ||  || — || November 21, 2008 || Kitt Peak || Spacewatch ||  || align=right | 2.2 km || 
|-id=104 bgcolor=#E9E9E9
| 575104 ||  || — || September 5, 2008 || Kitt Peak || Spacewatch ||  || align=right | 1.3 km || 
|-id=105 bgcolor=#E9E9E9
| 575105 ||  || — || April 9, 2002 || Palomar || NEAT ||  || align=right | 2.7 km || 
|-id=106 bgcolor=#E9E9E9
| 575106 ||  || — || October 23, 2008 || Kitt Peak || Spacewatch ||  || align=right | 2.3 km || 
|-id=107 bgcolor=#E9E9E9
| 575107 ||  || — || April 23, 2011 || Haleakala || Pan-STARRS ||  || align=right | 2.3 km || 
|-id=108 bgcolor=#d6d6d6
| 575108 ||  || — || August 5, 2005 || Palomar || NEAT || 3:2 || align=right | 4.2 km || 
|-id=109 bgcolor=#d6d6d6
| 575109 ||  || — || April 27, 2011 || Mount Lemmon || Mount Lemmon Survey ||  || align=right | 2.4 km || 
|-id=110 bgcolor=#E9E9E9
| 575110 ||  || — || November 9, 2008 || Mount Lemmon || Mount Lemmon Survey ||  || align=right | 2.0 km || 
|-id=111 bgcolor=#E9E9E9
| 575111 ||  || — || March 23, 2002 || Kitt Peak || Spacewatch ||  || align=right | 1.4 km || 
|-id=112 bgcolor=#E9E9E9
| 575112 ||  || — || April 28, 2011 || Mount Lemmon || Mount Lemmon Survey ||  || align=right data-sort-value="0.60" | 600 m || 
|-id=113 bgcolor=#E9E9E9
| 575113 ||  || — || September 19, 2003 || Kitt Peak || Spacewatch ||  || align=right | 1.9 km || 
|-id=114 bgcolor=#E9E9E9
| 575114 ||  || — || February 14, 2010 || Mount Lemmon || Mount Lemmon Survey ||  || align=right | 1.8 km || 
|-id=115 bgcolor=#fefefe
| 575115 ||  || — || February 11, 2004 || Kitt Peak || Spacewatch ||  || align=right data-sort-value="0.65" | 650 m || 
|-id=116 bgcolor=#E9E9E9
| 575116 ||  || — || May 5, 2002 || Palomar || NEAT ||  || align=right | 2.1 km || 
|-id=117 bgcolor=#E9E9E9
| 575117 ||  || — || March 14, 2011 || Kitt Peak || Spacewatch ||  || align=right | 1.8 km || 
|-id=118 bgcolor=#E9E9E9
| 575118 ||  || — || February 7, 2006 || Kitt Peak || Spacewatch ||  || align=right | 1.7 km || 
|-id=119 bgcolor=#E9E9E9
| 575119 ||  || — || October 23, 2003 || Kitt Peak || Spacewatch ||  || align=right | 2.8 km || 
|-id=120 bgcolor=#E9E9E9
| 575120 ||  || — || November 21, 2009 || Mount Lemmon || Mount Lemmon Survey ||  || align=right | 2.8 km || 
|-id=121 bgcolor=#E9E9E9
| 575121 ||  || — || September 29, 1995 || Kitt Peak || Spacewatch ||  || align=right | 1.6 km || 
|-id=122 bgcolor=#E9E9E9
| 575122 ||  || — || January 30, 2006 || Kitt Peak || Spacewatch ||  || align=right | 1.4 km || 
|-id=123 bgcolor=#E9E9E9
| 575123 ||  || — || December 20, 2001 || Apache Point || SDSS Collaboration || EUN || align=right | 1.3 km || 
|-id=124 bgcolor=#E9E9E9
| 575124 ||  || — || April 27, 2011 || Kitt Peak || Spacewatch ||  || align=right | 1.1 km || 
|-id=125 bgcolor=#E9E9E9
| 575125 ||  || — || February 25, 2006 || Kitt Peak || Spacewatch ||  || align=right | 1.6 km || 
|-id=126 bgcolor=#E9E9E9
| 575126 ||  || — || April 1, 2011 || Kitt Peak || Spacewatch ||  || align=right | 2.0 km || 
|-id=127 bgcolor=#E9E9E9
| 575127 ||  || — || October 20, 1995 || Kitt Peak || Spacewatch ||  || align=right | 1.6 km || 
|-id=128 bgcolor=#E9E9E9
| 575128 ||  || — || April 23, 2011 || Haleakala || Pan-STARRS ||  || align=right | 1.7 km || 
|-id=129 bgcolor=#E9E9E9
| 575129 ||  || — || April 27, 2011 || Kitt Peak || Spacewatch ||  || align=right | 2.1 km || 
|-id=130 bgcolor=#E9E9E9
| 575130 ||  || — || April 27, 2011 || Haleakala || Pan-STARRS ||  || align=right | 2.0 km || 
|-id=131 bgcolor=#E9E9E9
| 575131 ||  || — || April 28, 2011 || Kitt Peak || Spacewatch ||  || align=right | 1.8 km || 
|-id=132 bgcolor=#E9E9E9
| 575132 ||  || — || November 19, 2008 || Kitt Peak || Spacewatch ||  || align=right | 2.2 km || 
|-id=133 bgcolor=#E9E9E9
| 575133 ||  || — || September 27, 2008 || Mount Lemmon || Mount Lemmon Survey ||  || align=right data-sort-value="0.90" | 900 m || 
|-id=134 bgcolor=#E9E9E9
| 575134 ||  || — || April 26, 2011 || Mount Lemmon || Mount Lemmon Survey ||  || align=right | 1.6 km || 
|-id=135 bgcolor=#d6d6d6
| 575135 ||  || — || April 26, 2011 || Mount Lemmon || Mount Lemmon Survey ||  || align=right | 2.7 km || 
|-id=136 bgcolor=#d6d6d6
| 575136 ||  || — || April 24, 2011 || Mount Lemmon || Mount Lemmon Survey ||  || align=right | 2.8 km || 
|-id=137 bgcolor=#E9E9E9
| 575137 ||  || — || December 29, 2014 || Haleakala || Pan-STARRS ||  || align=right | 1.7 km || 
|-id=138 bgcolor=#E9E9E9
| 575138 ||  || — || November 29, 2013 || Haleakala || Pan-STARRS ||  || align=right | 1.4 km || 
|-id=139 bgcolor=#E9E9E9
| 575139 ||  || — || September 29, 2017 || Catalina || CSS ||  || align=right | 1.5 km || 
|-id=140 bgcolor=#d6d6d6
| 575140 ||  || — || April 30, 2011 || Kitt Peak || Spacewatch ||  || align=right | 1.8 km || 
|-id=141 bgcolor=#E9E9E9
| 575141 ||  || — || May 8, 2011 || Catalina || CSS ||  || align=right | 2.0 km || 
|-id=142 bgcolor=#fefefe
| 575142 ||  || — || September 11, 2005 || Kitt Peak || Spacewatch ||  || align=right data-sort-value="0.59" | 590 m || 
|-id=143 bgcolor=#E9E9E9
| 575143 ||  || — || May 1, 2011 || Haleakala || Pan-STARRS ||  || align=right | 1.9 km || 
|-id=144 bgcolor=#E9E9E9
| 575144 ||  || — || May 1, 2011 || Haleakala || Pan-STARRS ||  || align=right | 1.4 km || 
|-id=145 bgcolor=#fefefe
| 575145 ||  || — || April 22, 2007 || Mount Lemmon || Mount Lemmon Survey ||  || align=right data-sort-value="0.79" | 790 m || 
|-id=146 bgcolor=#fefefe
| 575146 ||  || — || July 30, 1995 || Kitt Peak || Spacewatch ||  || align=right data-sort-value="0.57" | 570 m || 
|-id=147 bgcolor=#E9E9E9
| 575147 ||  || — || December 25, 2005 || Catalina || CSS ||  || align=right | 2.2 km || 
|-id=148 bgcolor=#E9E9E9
| 575148 ||  || — || May 8, 2011 || Kitt Peak || Spacewatch ||  || align=right | 2.0 km || 
|-id=149 bgcolor=#fefefe
| 575149 ||  || — || May 9, 2011 || Mount Lemmon || Mount Lemmon Survey ||  || align=right data-sort-value="0.47" | 470 m || 
|-id=150 bgcolor=#d6d6d6
| 575150 ||  || — || August 26, 2012 || Haleakala || Pan-STARRS ||  || align=right | 1.8 km || 
|-id=151 bgcolor=#E9E9E9
| 575151 ||  || — || January 28, 2015 || Haleakala || Pan-STARRS ||  || align=right | 1.6 km || 
|-id=152 bgcolor=#E9E9E9
| 575152 ||  || — || May 9, 2011 || Kitt Peak || Spacewatch ||  || align=right | 2.4 km || 
|-id=153 bgcolor=#fefefe
| 575153 ||  || — || May 23, 2011 || Mount Lemmon || Mount Lemmon Survey ||  || align=right data-sort-value="0.61" | 610 m || 
|-id=154 bgcolor=#E9E9E9
| 575154 ||  || — || September 26, 2003 || Apache Point || SDSS Collaboration ||  || align=right | 1.9 km || 
|-id=155 bgcolor=#E9E9E9
| 575155 ||  || — || May 24, 2011 || Mount Lemmon || Mount Lemmon Survey ||  || align=right data-sort-value="0.82" | 820 m || 
|-id=156 bgcolor=#E9E9E9
| 575156 ||  || — || September 22, 2008 || Kitt Peak || Spacewatch ||  || align=right | 2.3 km || 
|-id=157 bgcolor=#fefefe
| 575157 ||  || — || May 24, 2011 || Haleakala || Pan-STARRS || H || align=right data-sort-value="0.49" | 490 m || 
|-id=158 bgcolor=#d6d6d6
| 575158 ||  || — || May 22, 2011 || Mount Lemmon || Mount Lemmon Survey ||  || align=right | 2.3 km || 
|-id=159 bgcolor=#FA8072
| 575159 ||  || — || May 24, 2011 || Haleakala || Pan-STARRS ||  || align=right data-sort-value="0.94" | 940 m || 
|-id=160 bgcolor=#fefefe
| 575160 ||  || — || May 24, 2011 || Haleakala || Pan-STARRS ||  || align=right data-sort-value="0.64" | 640 m || 
|-id=161 bgcolor=#fefefe
| 575161 ||  || — || May 24, 2011 || Haleakala || Pan-STARRS ||  || align=right data-sort-value="0.53" | 530 m || 
|-id=162 bgcolor=#fefefe
| 575162 ||  || — || May 21, 2011 || Kitt Peak || Spacewatch || H || align=right data-sort-value="0.57" | 570 m || 
|-id=163 bgcolor=#fefefe
| 575163 ||  || — || May 30, 2011 || Haleakala || Pan-STARRS ||  || align=right data-sort-value="0.71" | 710 m || 
|-id=164 bgcolor=#fefefe
| 575164 ||  || — || May 21, 2011 || Nogales || M. Schwartz, P. R. Holvorcem ||  || align=right data-sort-value="0.67" | 670 m || 
|-id=165 bgcolor=#E9E9E9
| 575165 ||  || — || October 30, 2008 || Kitt Peak || Spacewatch ||  || align=right | 2.1 km || 
|-id=166 bgcolor=#E9E9E9
| 575166 ||  || — || May 31, 2011 || Mount Lemmon || Mount Lemmon Survey ||  || align=right data-sort-value="0.98" | 980 m || 
|-id=167 bgcolor=#fefefe
| 575167 ||  || — || May 24, 2011 || Haleakala || Pan-STARRS ||  || align=right data-sort-value="0.69" | 690 m || 
|-id=168 bgcolor=#E9E9E9
| 575168 ||  || — || March 26, 2006 || Mount Lemmon || Mount Lemmon Survey ||  || align=right | 1.6 km || 
|-id=169 bgcolor=#d6d6d6
| 575169 ||  || — || September 13, 2007 || Mount Lemmon || Mount Lemmon Survey ||  || align=right | 2.2 km || 
|-id=170 bgcolor=#E9E9E9
| 575170 ||  || — || May 26, 2011 || Mount Lemmon || Mount Lemmon Survey ||  || align=right | 2.0 km || 
|-id=171 bgcolor=#E9E9E9
| 575171 ||  || — || May 24, 2011 || Haleakala || Pan-STARRS ||  || align=right | 1.3 km || 
|-id=172 bgcolor=#d6d6d6
| 575172 ||  || — || May 5, 2011 || Mount Lemmon || Mount Lemmon Survey ||  || align=right | 2.1 km || 
|-id=173 bgcolor=#E9E9E9
| 575173 ||  || — || May 26, 2011 || Mount Lemmon || Mount Lemmon Survey ||  || align=right | 1.9 km || 
|-id=174 bgcolor=#E9E9E9
| 575174 ||  || — || May 24, 2011 || Mount Lemmon || Mount Lemmon Survey ||  || align=right data-sort-value="0.98" | 980 m || 
|-id=175 bgcolor=#E9E9E9
| 575175 ||  || — || January 21, 2015 || Haleakala || Pan-STARRS ||  || align=right | 2.0 km || 
|-id=176 bgcolor=#fefefe
| 575176 ||  || — || April 5, 2014 || Haleakala || Pan-STARRS ||  || align=right data-sort-value="0.50" | 500 m || 
|-id=177 bgcolor=#E9E9E9
| 575177 ||  || — || May 22, 2011 || Mount Lemmon || Mount Lemmon Survey ||  || align=right | 1.7 km || 
|-id=178 bgcolor=#fefefe
| 575178 ||  || — || May 26, 2011 || Nogales || M. Schwartz, P. R. Holvorcem ||  || align=right data-sort-value="0.53" | 530 m || 
|-id=179 bgcolor=#fefefe
| 575179 ||  || — || May 6, 2011 || Kitt Peak || Spacewatch || H || align=right data-sort-value="0.62" | 620 m || 
|-id=180 bgcolor=#E9E9E9
| 575180 ||  || — || June 3, 2011 || Mount Lemmon || Mount Lemmon Survey ||  || align=right | 1.7 km || 
|-id=181 bgcolor=#E9E9E9
| 575181 ||  || — || May 27, 2011 || Kitt Peak || Spacewatch ||  || align=right | 2.1 km || 
|-id=182 bgcolor=#E9E9E9
| 575182 ||  || — || June 5, 2011 || Kitt Peak || Spacewatch ||  || align=right | 2.4 km || 
|-id=183 bgcolor=#E9E9E9
| 575183 ||  || — || June 7, 2011 || Mount Lemmon || Mount Lemmon Survey ||  || align=right | 1.9 km || 
|-id=184 bgcolor=#E9E9E9
| 575184 ||  || — || May 22, 2011 || Mount Lemmon || Mount Lemmon Survey ||  || align=right | 1.7 km || 
|-id=185 bgcolor=#E9E9E9
| 575185 ||  || — || June 5, 2011 || Andrushivka || Y. Ivaščenko, P. Kyrylenko ||  || align=right data-sort-value="0.94" | 940 m || 
|-id=186 bgcolor=#E9E9E9
| 575186 ||  || — || May 25, 2011 || Kitt Peak || Spacewatch ||  || align=right data-sort-value="0.94" | 940 m || 
|-id=187 bgcolor=#fefefe
| 575187 ||  || — || June 6, 2011 || Haleakala || Pan-STARRS || H || align=right data-sort-value="0.68" | 680 m || 
|-id=188 bgcolor=#E9E9E9
| 575188 ||  || — || June 1, 2011 || ESA OGS || ESA OGS ||  || align=right | 2.0 km || 
|-id=189 bgcolor=#fefefe
| 575189 ||  || — || June 7, 2011 || Haleakala || Pan-STARRS ||  || align=right data-sort-value="0.48" | 480 m || 
|-id=190 bgcolor=#E9E9E9
| 575190 ||  || — || June 9, 2011 || Mount Lemmon || Mount Lemmon Survey ||  || align=right | 1.7 km || 
|-id=191 bgcolor=#fefefe
| 575191 ||  || — || February 26, 2014 || Haleakala || Pan-STARRS ||  || align=right data-sort-value="0.56" | 560 m || 
|-id=192 bgcolor=#E9E9E9
| 575192 ||  || — || June 3, 2011 || Mount Lemmon || Mount Lemmon Survey ||  || align=right data-sort-value="0.94" | 940 m || 
|-id=193 bgcolor=#E9E9E9
| 575193 ||  || — || March 17, 2015 || Haleakala || Pan-STARRS ||  || align=right data-sort-value="0.81" | 810 m || 
|-id=194 bgcolor=#E9E9E9
| 575194 ||  || — || May 21, 2015 || Haleakala || Pan-STARRS ||  || align=right data-sort-value="0.94" | 940 m || 
|-id=195 bgcolor=#fefefe
| 575195 Carpineti ||  ||  || December 6, 2012 || Tincana || M. Żołnowski, M. Kusiak ||  || align=right data-sort-value="0.77" | 770 m || 
|-id=196 bgcolor=#d6d6d6
| 575196 ||  || — || June 11, 2011 || Mount Lemmon || Mount Lemmon Survey ||  || align=right | 2.4 km || 
|-id=197 bgcolor=#E9E9E9
| 575197 ||  || — || June 3, 2011 || Mount Lemmon || Mount Lemmon Survey ||  || align=right | 2.3 km || 
|-id=198 bgcolor=#E9E9E9
| 575198 ||  || — || June 8, 2011 || Mount Lemmon || Mount Lemmon Survey ||  || align=right | 1.0 km || 
|-id=199 bgcolor=#C2FFFF
| 575199 ||  || — || June 11, 2011 || Mount Lemmon || Mount Lemmon Survey || L5 || align=right | 7.6 km || 
|-id=200 bgcolor=#E9E9E9
| 575200 ||  || — || June 5, 2011 || Mount Lemmon || Mount Lemmon Survey ||  || align=right | 1.7 km || 
|}

575201–575300 

|-bgcolor=#E9E9E9
| 575201 ||  || — || June 22, 2011 || Mount Lemmon || Mount Lemmon Survey ||  || align=right | 1.1 km || 
|-id=202 bgcolor=#fefefe
| 575202 ||  || — || October 9, 2008 || Mount Lemmon || Mount Lemmon Survey ||  || align=right data-sort-value="0.54" | 540 m || 
|-id=203 bgcolor=#E9E9E9
| 575203 ||  || — || May 30, 2011 || Haleakala || Pan-STARRS ||  || align=right | 2.5 km || 
|-id=204 bgcolor=#E9E9E9
| 575204 ||  || — || June 22, 2011 || Kitt Peak || Spacewatch ||  || align=right | 1.4 km || 
|-id=205 bgcolor=#d6d6d6
| 575205 ||  || — || November 11, 2012 || Nogales || M. Schwartz, P. R. Holvorcem ||  || align=right | 3.5 km || 
|-id=206 bgcolor=#d6d6d6
| 575206 ||  || — || June 27, 2011 || Kitt Peak || Spacewatch ||  || align=right | 2.2 km || 
|-id=207 bgcolor=#E9E9E9
| 575207 ||  || — || June 27, 2011 || Mount Lemmon || Mount Lemmon Survey ||  || align=right data-sort-value="0.94" | 940 m || 
|-id=208 bgcolor=#d6d6d6
| 575208 ||  || — || September 26, 2017 || Haleakala || Pan-STARRS ||  || align=right | 2.2 km || 
|-id=209 bgcolor=#E9E9E9
| 575209 ||  || — || December 3, 2012 || Mount Lemmon || Mount Lemmon Survey ||  || align=right | 1.0 km || 
|-id=210 bgcolor=#d6d6d6
| 575210 ||  || — || June 29, 2011 || Kitt Peak || Spacewatch ||  || align=right | 2.5 km || 
|-id=211 bgcolor=#d6d6d6
| 575211 ||  || — || July 1, 2011 || Mount Lemmon || Mount Lemmon Survey ||  || align=right | 2.5 km || 
|-id=212 bgcolor=#d6d6d6
| 575212 ||  || — || September 17, 2006 || Catalina || CSS ||  || align=right | 2.4 km || 
|-id=213 bgcolor=#E9E9E9
| 575213 ||  || — || July 25, 2011 || Haleakala || Pan-STARRS ||  || align=right | 2.3 km || 
|-id=214 bgcolor=#fefefe
| 575214 ||  || — || July 25, 2011 || Haleakala || Pan-STARRS ||  || align=right data-sort-value="0.55" | 550 m || 
|-id=215 bgcolor=#E9E9E9
| 575215 ||  || — || July 26, 2011 || Haleakala || Pan-STARRS ||  || align=right | 1.4 km || 
|-id=216 bgcolor=#fefefe
| 575216 ||  || — || July 24, 2011 || La Sagra || OAM Obs. ||  || align=right data-sort-value="0.72" | 720 m || 
|-id=217 bgcolor=#E9E9E9
| 575217 ||  || — || June 11, 2011 || Mount Lemmon || Mount Lemmon Survey ||  || align=right data-sort-value="0.90" | 900 m || 
|-id=218 bgcolor=#E9E9E9
| 575218 ||  || — || March 18, 2010 || Kitt Peak || Spacewatch ||  || align=right | 2.6 km || 
|-id=219 bgcolor=#fefefe
| 575219 ||  || — || May 4, 2014 || Haleakala || Pan-STARRS ||  || align=right data-sort-value="0.52" | 520 m || 
|-id=220 bgcolor=#d6d6d6
| 575220 ||  || — || July 28, 2011 || Haleakala || Pan-STARRS ||  || align=right | 2.7 km || 
|-id=221 bgcolor=#d6d6d6
| 575221 ||  || — || March 1, 2009 || Kitt Peak || Spacewatch ||  || align=right | 2.9 km || 
|-id=222 bgcolor=#E9E9E9
| 575222 ||  || — || January 1, 2009 || Kitt Peak || Spacewatch ||  || align=right data-sort-value="0.98" | 980 m || 
|-id=223 bgcolor=#d6d6d6
| 575223 ||  || — || July 21, 2006 || Mount Lemmon || Mount Lemmon Survey ||  || align=right | 2.8 km || 
|-id=224 bgcolor=#d6d6d6
| 575224 ||  || — || October 19, 2006 || Catalina || CSS ||  || align=right | 2.4 km || 
|-id=225 bgcolor=#fefefe
| 575225 ||  || — || October 8, 2008 || Mount Lemmon || Mount Lemmon Survey ||  || align=right data-sort-value="0.76" | 760 m || 
|-id=226 bgcolor=#fefefe
| 575226 ||  || — || October 7, 2008 || Mount Lemmon || Mount Lemmon Survey ||  || align=right data-sort-value="0.53" | 530 m || 
|-id=227 bgcolor=#E9E9E9
| 575227 ||  || — || July 27, 2011 || Palomar || PTF ||  || align=right | 2.0 km || 
|-id=228 bgcolor=#d6d6d6
| 575228 ||  || — || March 8, 2005 || Mount Lemmon || Mount Lemmon Survey ||  || align=right | 2.3 km || 
|-id=229 bgcolor=#E9E9E9
| 575229 ||  || — || September 8, 2016 || Haleakala || Pan-STARRS ||  || align=right | 1.7 km || 
|-id=230 bgcolor=#d6d6d6
| 575230 ||  || — || July 28, 2011 || Haleakala || Pan-STARRS ||  || align=right | 2.4 km || 
|-id=231 bgcolor=#d6d6d6
| 575231 ||  || — || January 20, 2015 || Haleakala || Pan-STARRS ||  || align=right | 2.3 km || 
|-id=232 bgcolor=#d6d6d6
| 575232 ||  || — || February 16, 2015 || Haleakala || Pan-STARRS ||  || align=right | 1.8 km || 
|-id=233 bgcolor=#C2FFFF
| 575233 ||  || — || July 28, 2011 || Haleakala || Pan-STARRS || L5 || align=right | 6.5 km || 
|-id=234 bgcolor=#E9E9E9
| 575234 ||  || — || March 8, 2005 || Mount Lemmon || Mount Lemmon Survey ||  || align=right | 1.4 km || 
|-id=235 bgcolor=#d6d6d6
| 575235 ||  || — || June 26, 2011 || Mount Lemmon || Mount Lemmon Survey ||  || align=right | 2.9 km || 
|-id=236 bgcolor=#d6d6d6
| 575236 ||  || — || July 28, 2011 || Haleakala || Pan-STARRS ||  || align=right | 2.5 km || 
|-id=237 bgcolor=#d6d6d6
| 575237 ||  || — || July 28, 2011 || Haleakala || Pan-STARRS ||  || align=right | 2.2 km || 
|-id=238 bgcolor=#fefefe
| 575238 ||  || — || September 28, 2001 || Palomar || NEAT ||  || align=right data-sort-value="0.62" | 620 m || 
|-id=239 bgcolor=#fefefe
| 575239 ||  || — || August 4, 2011 || Haleakala || Pan-STARRS ||  || align=right data-sort-value="0.63" | 630 m || 
|-id=240 bgcolor=#fefefe
| 575240 ||  || — || August 6, 2011 || Haleakala || Pan-STARRS || V || align=right data-sort-value="0.54" | 540 m || 
|-id=241 bgcolor=#d6d6d6
| 575241 ||  || — || March 1, 2009 || Kitt Peak || Spacewatch ||  || align=right | 2.3 km || 
|-id=242 bgcolor=#fefefe
| 575242 ||  || — || October 29, 2008 || Mount Lemmon || Mount Lemmon Survey ||  || align=right data-sort-value="0.54" | 540 m || 
|-id=243 bgcolor=#C2FFFF
| 575243 ||  || — || October 14, 2012 || Mount Lemmon || Mount Lemmon Survey || L5 || align=right | 6.6 km || 
|-id=244 bgcolor=#d6d6d6
| 575244 ||  || — || August 2, 2016 || Haleakala || Pan-STARRS ||  || align=right | 2.2 km || 
|-id=245 bgcolor=#d6d6d6
| 575245 ||  || — || December 3, 2012 || Mount Lemmon || Mount Lemmon Survey ||  || align=right | 2.2 km || 
|-id=246 bgcolor=#d6d6d6
| 575246 ||  || — || August 1, 2011 || Haleakala || Pan-STARRS ||  || align=right | 3.4 km || 
|-id=247 bgcolor=#d6d6d6
| 575247 ||  || — || October 17, 2017 || Mount Lemmon || Mount Lemmon Survey ||  || align=right | 2.0 km || 
|-id=248 bgcolor=#d6d6d6
| 575248 ||  || — || September 23, 2017 || Haleakala || Pan-STARRS ||  || align=right | 2.2 km || 
|-id=249 bgcolor=#d6d6d6
| 575249 ||  || — || August 1, 2011 || Haleakala || Pan-STARRS ||  || align=right | 2.3 km || 
|-id=250 bgcolor=#fefefe
| 575250 ||  || — || August 18, 2011 || Haleakala || Pan-STARRS || H || align=right data-sort-value="0.55" | 550 m || 
|-id=251 bgcolor=#d6d6d6
| 575251 ||  || — || December 16, 2007 || Catalina || CSS ||  || align=right | 2.9 km || 
|-id=252 bgcolor=#d6d6d6
| 575252 ||  || — || October 17, 2006 || Catalina || CSS ||  || align=right | 2.7 km || 
|-id=253 bgcolor=#d6d6d6
| 575253 ||  || — || August 20, 2011 || Pla D'Arguines || R. Ferrando, M. Ferrando ||  || align=right | 3.0 km || 
|-id=254 bgcolor=#C2FFFF
| 575254 ||  || — || July 2, 2011 || Kitt Peak || Spacewatch || L5 || align=right | 11 km || 
|-id=255 bgcolor=#FA8072
| 575255 ||  || — || August 17, 2006 || Palomar || NEAT || H || align=right data-sort-value="0.51" | 510 m || 
|-id=256 bgcolor=#d6d6d6
| 575256 ||  || — || September 16, 2006 || Catalina || CSS ||  || align=right | 2.7 km || 
|-id=257 bgcolor=#d6d6d6
| 575257 ||  || — || August 22, 2011 || Charleston || R. Holmes || BRA || align=right | 1.6 km || 
|-id=258 bgcolor=#C2FFFF
| 575258 ||  || — || December 1, 2005 || Kitt Peak || L. H. Wasserman, R. Millis || L5 || align=right | 8.9 km || 
|-id=259 bgcolor=#d6d6d6
| 575259 ||  || — || August 20, 2011 || Haleakala || Pan-STARRS ||  || align=right | 2.2 km || 
|-id=260 bgcolor=#d6d6d6
| 575260 ||  || — || October 11, 2006 || Apache Point || SDSS Collaboration ||  || align=right | 2.8 km || 
|-id=261 bgcolor=#fefefe
| 575261 ||  || — || August 23, 2011 || Haleakala || Pan-STARRS ||  || align=right data-sort-value="0.62" | 620 m || 
|-id=262 bgcolor=#d6d6d6
| 575262 ||  || — || December 3, 2002 || Palomar || NEAT ||  || align=right | 3.1 km || 
|-id=263 bgcolor=#C2FFFF
| 575263 ||  || — || April 29, 2008 || Mount Lemmon || Mount Lemmon Survey || L5 || align=right | 6.3 km || 
|-id=264 bgcolor=#fefefe
| 575264 ||  || — || August 20, 2011 || Haleakala || Pan-STARRS ||  || align=right data-sort-value="0.53" | 530 m || 
|-id=265 bgcolor=#d6d6d6
| 575265 ||  || — || August 26, 2011 || Kitt Peak || Spacewatch ||  || align=right | 3.0 km || 
|-id=266 bgcolor=#E9E9E9
| 575266 ||  || — || September 13, 2002 || Palomar || NEAT ||  || align=right | 3.6 km || 
|-id=267 bgcolor=#fefefe
| 575267 ||  || — || August 26, 2011 || Haleakala || Pan-STARRS ||  || align=right data-sort-value="0.85" | 850 m || 
|-id=268 bgcolor=#E9E9E9
| 575268 ||  || — || October 15, 2007 || Catalina || CSS || EUN || align=right | 1.1 km || 
|-id=269 bgcolor=#fefefe
| 575269 ||  || — || August 26, 2011 || Haleakala || Pan-STARRS ||  || align=right data-sort-value="0.65" | 650 m || 
|-id=270 bgcolor=#d6d6d6
| 575270 ||  || — || May 4, 2005 || Catalina || CSS ||  || align=right | 2.4 km || 
|-id=271 bgcolor=#d6d6d6
| 575271 ||  || — || August 28, 2011 || Eskridge || E. Dose || KOR || align=right | 1.4 km || 
|-id=272 bgcolor=#d6d6d6
| 575272 ||  || — || August 28, 2011 || Dauban || C. Rinner, F. Kugel ||  || align=right | 3.4 km || 
|-id=273 bgcolor=#FA8072
| 575273 ||  || — || October 1, 2008 || Mount Lemmon || Mount Lemmon Survey ||  || align=right data-sort-value="0.52" | 520 m || 
|-id=274 bgcolor=#fefefe
| 575274 ||  || — || August 23, 2011 || Andrushivka || Y. Ivaščenko, P. Kyrylenko ||  || align=right data-sort-value="0.61" | 610 m || 
|-id=275 bgcolor=#C2FFFF
| 575275 ||  || — || August 29, 2011 || Haleakala || T. Lister || L5 || align=right | 8.3 km || 
|-id=276 bgcolor=#E9E9E9
| 575276 ||  || — || September 10, 2007 || Kitt Peak || Spacewatch ||  || align=right data-sort-value="0.82" | 820 m || 
|-id=277 bgcolor=#fefefe
| 575277 ||  || — || August 26, 2011 || Haleakala || Pan-STARRS ||  || align=right data-sort-value="0.55" | 550 m || 
|-id=278 bgcolor=#fefefe
| 575278 ||  || — || September 24, 2008 || Kitt Peak || Spacewatch ||  || align=right data-sort-value="0.55" | 550 m || 
|-id=279 bgcolor=#E9E9E9
| 575279 ||  || — || August 27, 2011 || Andrushivka || Y. Ivaščenko, P. Kyrylenko ||  || align=right | 1.3 km || 
|-id=280 bgcolor=#d6d6d6
| 575280 ||  || — || September 28, 2006 || Mount Lemmon || Mount Lemmon Survey ||  || align=right | 2.3 km || 
|-id=281 bgcolor=#E9E9E9
| 575281 ||  || — || October 12, 2007 || Mount Lemmon || Mount Lemmon Survey ||  || align=right | 1.2 km || 
|-id=282 bgcolor=#fefefe
| 575282 ||  || — || August 26, 2011 || Kitt Peak || Spacewatch ||  || align=right data-sort-value="0.55" | 550 m || 
|-id=283 bgcolor=#d6d6d6
| 575283 ||  || — || September 26, 2006 || Moletai || K. Černis, J. Zdanavičius ||  || align=right | 3.4 km || 
|-id=284 bgcolor=#d6d6d6
| 575284 ||  || — || July 29, 2000 || Cerro Tololo || M. W. Buie, S. D. Kern || EOS || align=right | 1.5 km || 
|-id=285 bgcolor=#E9E9E9
| 575285 ||  || — || August 26, 2011 || Haleakala || Pan-STARRS ||  || align=right | 2.8 km || 
|-id=286 bgcolor=#d6d6d6
| 575286 ||  || — || August 26, 2000 || Cerro Tololo || R. Millis, L. H. Wasserman || EOS || align=right | 2.4 km || 
|-id=287 bgcolor=#fefefe
| 575287 ||  || — || August 6, 2004 || Palomar || NEAT ||  || align=right data-sort-value="0.55" | 550 m || 
|-id=288 bgcolor=#fefefe
| 575288 ||  || — || August 23, 2011 || Haleakala || Pan-STARRS ||  || align=right data-sort-value="0.58" | 580 m || 
|-id=289 bgcolor=#fefefe
| 575289 ||  || — || October 7, 1994 || Kitt Peak || Spacewatch ||  || align=right data-sort-value="0.58" | 580 m || 
|-id=290 bgcolor=#d6d6d6
| 575290 ||  || — || August 29, 2006 || Kitt Peak || Spacewatch ||  || align=right | 2.4 km || 
|-id=291 bgcolor=#d6d6d6
| 575291 ||  || — || September 28, 2006 || Mount Lemmon || Mount Lemmon Survey ||  || align=right | 2.5 km || 
|-id=292 bgcolor=#E9E9E9
| 575292 ||  || — || October 10, 2007 || Kitt Peak || Spacewatch ||  || align=right | 1.3 km || 
|-id=293 bgcolor=#d6d6d6
| 575293 ||  || — || July 28, 2011 || Haleakala || Pan-STARRS ||  || align=right | 1.9 km || 
|-id=294 bgcolor=#fefefe
| 575294 ||  || — || August 23, 2011 || Haleakala || Pan-STARRS ||  || align=right data-sort-value="0.73" | 730 m || 
|-id=295 bgcolor=#fefefe
| 575295 ||  || — || August 23, 2011 || Haleakala || Pan-STARRS ||  || align=right data-sort-value="0.69" | 690 m || 
|-id=296 bgcolor=#d6d6d6
| 575296 ||  || — || January 25, 2009 || Kitt Peak || Spacewatch ||  || align=right | 3.1 km || 
|-id=297 bgcolor=#d6d6d6
| 575297 ||  || — || August 24, 2011 || Haleakala || Pan-STARRS ||  || align=right | 2.5 km || 
|-id=298 bgcolor=#fefefe
| 575298 ||  || — || October 24, 2008 || Kitt Peak || Spacewatch ||  || align=right data-sort-value="0.43" | 430 m || 
|-id=299 bgcolor=#d6d6d6
| 575299 ||  || — || August 26, 2011 || Haleakala || Pan-STARRS ||  || align=right | 1.9 km || 
|-id=300 bgcolor=#d6d6d6
| 575300 ||  || — || August 26, 2011 || Haleakala || Pan-STARRS ||  || align=right | 3.0 km || 
|}

575301–575400 

|-bgcolor=#d6d6d6
| 575301 ||  || — || July 15, 2005 || Mount Lemmon || Mount Lemmon Survey || VER || align=right | 3.0 km || 
|-id=302 bgcolor=#d6d6d6
| 575302 ||  || — || August 30, 2011 || Haleakala || Pan-STARRS ||  || align=right | 2.3 km || 
|-id=303 bgcolor=#d6d6d6
| 575303 ||  || — || August 31, 2011 || Haleakala || Pan-STARRS ||  || align=right | 2.3 km || 
|-id=304 bgcolor=#fefefe
| 575304 ||  || — || August 21, 2004 || Siding Spring || SSS ||  || align=right data-sort-value="0.94" | 940 m || 
|-id=305 bgcolor=#d6d6d6
| 575305 ||  || — || November 13, 2012 || Kitt Peak || Spacewatch ||  || align=right | 2.6 km || 
|-id=306 bgcolor=#d6d6d6
| 575306 ||  || — || January 9, 2014 || Mount Lemmon || Mount Lemmon Survey ||  || align=right | 2.9 km || 
|-id=307 bgcolor=#d6d6d6
| 575307 ||  || — || October 20, 2012 || Haleakala || Pan-STARRS ||  || align=right | 2.3 km || 
|-id=308 bgcolor=#d6d6d6
| 575308 ||  || — || August 31, 2011 || Haleakala || Pan-STARRS ||  || align=right | 2.5 km || 
|-id=309 bgcolor=#d6d6d6
| 575309 ||  || — || June 29, 2016 || Haleakala || Pan-STARRS ||  || align=right | 2.1 km || 
|-id=310 bgcolor=#d6d6d6
| 575310 ||  || — || January 30, 2014 || Kitt Peak || Spacewatch ||  || align=right | 3.0 km || 
|-id=311 bgcolor=#d6d6d6
| 575311 ||  || — || August 1, 2017 || Haleakala || Pan-STARRS ||  || align=right | 2.5 km || 
|-id=312 bgcolor=#fefefe
| 575312 ||  || — || August 24, 2011 || Siding Spring || SSS ||  || align=right data-sort-value="0.74" | 740 m || 
|-id=313 bgcolor=#d6d6d6
| 575313 ||  || — || August 11, 2016 || Haleakala || Pan-STARRS ||  || align=right | 1.9 km || 
|-id=314 bgcolor=#fefefe
| 575314 ||  || — || August 26, 2011 || Kitt Peak || Spacewatch ||  || align=right data-sort-value="0.79" | 790 m || 
|-id=315 bgcolor=#d6d6d6
| 575315 ||  || — || August 24, 2011 || Haleakala || Pan-STARRS ||  || align=right | 1.9 km || 
|-id=316 bgcolor=#d6d6d6
| 575316 ||  || — || August 24, 2011 || Haleakala || Pan-STARRS ||  || align=right | 2.5 km || 
|-id=317 bgcolor=#d6d6d6
| 575317 ||  || — || August 24, 2011 || Haleakala || Pan-STARRS ||  || align=right | 2.8 km || 
|-id=318 bgcolor=#d6d6d6
| 575318 ||  || — || September 2, 2011 || Haleakala || Pan-STARRS ||  || align=right | 2.2 km || 
|-id=319 bgcolor=#fefefe
| 575319 ||  || — || October 31, 2005 || Mauna Kea || Mauna Kea Obs. ||  || align=right data-sort-value="0.71" | 710 m || 
|-id=320 bgcolor=#d6d6d6
| 575320 ||  || — || September 2, 2011 || Haleakala || Pan-STARRS ||  || align=right | 2.1 km || 
|-id=321 bgcolor=#E9E9E9
| 575321 ||  || — || April 9, 2010 || Kitt Peak || Spacewatch ||  || align=right | 1.4 km || 
|-id=322 bgcolor=#d6d6d6
| 575322 ||  || — || September 5, 2011 || Haleakala || Pan-STARRS ||  || align=right | 2.2 km || 
|-id=323 bgcolor=#fefefe
| 575323 ||  || — || September 6, 2011 || Haleakala || Pan-STARRS ||  || align=right data-sort-value="0.50" | 500 m || 
|-id=324 bgcolor=#fefefe
| 575324 ||  || — || November 8, 2008 || Kitt Peak || Spacewatch ||  || align=right data-sort-value="0.51" | 510 m || 
|-id=325 bgcolor=#d6d6d6
| 575325 ||  || — || September 4, 2011 || Haleakala || Pan-STARRS ||  || align=right | 2.7 km || 
|-id=326 bgcolor=#d6d6d6
| 575326 ||  || — || July 5, 2005 || Mount Lemmon || Mount Lemmon Survey ||  || align=right | 3.1 km || 
|-id=327 bgcolor=#fefefe
| 575327 ||  || — || April 2, 2005 || Mount Lemmon || Mount Lemmon Survey || H || align=right data-sort-value="0.52" | 520 m || 
|-id=328 bgcolor=#d6d6d6
| 575328 ||  || — || September 8, 2011 || Haleakala || Pan-STARRS ||  || align=right | 2.2 km || 
|-id=329 bgcolor=#d6d6d6
| 575329 ||  || — || September 4, 2011 || Haleakala || Pan-STARRS ||  || align=right | 2.1 km || 
|-id=330 bgcolor=#fefefe
| 575330 ||  || — || November 9, 2015 || Mount Lemmon || Mount Lemmon Survey ||  || align=right data-sort-value="0.53" | 530 m || 
|-id=331 bgcolor=#E9E9E9
| 575331 ||  || — || September 8, 2011 || Haleakala || Pan-STARRS ||  || align=right | 1.4 km || 
|-id=332 bgcolor=#d6d6d6
| 575332 ||  || — || September 4, 2011 || Haleakala || Pan-STARRS ||  || align=right | 2.5 km || 
|-id=333 bgcolor=#d6d6d6
| 575333 ||  || — || September 4, 2011 || Haleakala || Pan-STARRS ||  || align=right | 1.9 km || 
|-id=334 bgcolor=#d6d6d6
| 575334 ||  || — || September 8, 2011 || Kitt Peak || Spacewatch ||  || align=right | 2.1 km || 
|-id=335 bgcolor=#fefefe
| 575335 ||  || — || March 12, 2010 || Mount Lemmon || Mount Lemmon Survey ||  || align=right data-sort-value="0.65" | 650 m || 
|-id=336 bgcolor=#fefefe
| 575336 ||  || — || August 20, 2011 || Haleakala || Pan-STARRS ||  || align=right data-sort-value="0.56" | 560 m || 
|-id=337 bgcolor=#E9E9E9
| 575337 ||  || — || September 18, 2011 || Mount Lemmon || Mount Lemmon Survey ||  || align=right | 1.5 km || 
|-id=338 bgcolor=#fefefe
| 575338 ||  || — || December 2, 2005 || Mauna Kea || Mauna Kea Obs. ||  || align=right data-sort-value="0.75" | 750 m || 
|-id=339 bgcolor=#fefefe
| 575339 ||  || — || September 19, 2011 || Mount Lemmon || Mount Lemmon Survey ||  || align=right data-sort-value="0.65" | 650 m || 
|-id=340 bgcolor=#fefefe
| 575340 ||  || — || September 18, 2011 || Catalina || CSS ||  || align=right data-sort-value="0.63" | 630 m || 
|-id=341 bgcolor=#d6d6d6
| 575341 ||  || — || February 27, 2009 || Kitt Peak || Spacewatch ||  || align=right | 2.7 km || 
|-id=342 bgcolor=#d6d6d6
| 575342 ||  || — || December 5, 2007 || Kitt Peak || Spacewatch ||  || align=right | 2.5 km || 
|-id=343 bgcolor=#E9E9E9
| 575343 ||  || — || April 11, 2010 || Kitt Peak || Spacewatch ||  || align=right | 1.8 km || 
|-id=344 bgcolor=#d6d6d6
| 575344 ||  || — || March 8, 2009 || Mount Lemmon || Mount Lemmon Survey ||  || align=right | 3.1 km || 
|-id=345 bgcolor=#d6d6d6
| 575345 ||  || — || September 27, 2000 || Kitt Peak || Spacewatch ||  || align=right | 2.8 km || 
|-id=346 bgcolor=#fefefe
| 575346 ||  || — || September 20, 2011 || Kitt Peak || Spacewatch ||  || align=right data-sort-value="0.53" | 530 m || 
|-id=347 bgcolor=#d6d6d6
| 575347 ||  || — || April 21, 2009 || Mount Lemmon || Mount Lemmon Survey ||  || align=right | 2.6 km || 
|-id=348 bgcolor=#d6d6d6
| 575348 ||  || — || January 15, 2007 || Catalina || CSS ||  || align=right | 3.2 km || 
|-id=349 bgcolor=#d6d6d6
| 575349 ||  || — || September 20, 2011 || Taunus || S. Karge, R. Kling ||  || align=right | 4.4 km || 
|-id=350 bgcolor=#d6d6d6
| 575350 ||  || — || September 21, 2011 || Mount Lemmon || Mount Lemmon Survey ||  || align=right | 2.8 km || 
|-id=351 bgcolor=#d6d6d6
| 575351 ||  || — || August 1, 2000 || Cerro Tololo || M. W. Buie, S. D. Kern ||  || align=right | 2.5 km || 
|-id=352 bgcolor=#d6d6d6
| 575352 ||  || — || May 11, 2010 || Mount Lemmon || Mount Lemmon Survey ||  || align=right | 2.3 km || 
|-id=353 bgcolor=#fefefe
| 575353 ||  || — || October 4, 2004 || Kitt Peak || Spacewatch ||  || align=right data-sort-value="0.59" | 590 m || 
|-id=354 bgcolor=#fefefe
| 575354 ||  || — || October 4, 1997 || Kitt Peak || Spacewatch ||  || align=right data-sort-value="0.62" | 620 m || 
|-id=355 bgcolor=#d6d6d6
| 575355 ||  || — || September 23, 2011 || Mount Lemmon || Mount Lemmon Survey ||  || align=right | 2.2 km || 
|-id=356 bgcolor=#d6d6d6
| 575356 ||  || — || September 23, 2011 || Mount Lemmon || Mount Lemmon Survey ||  || align=right | 2.5 km || 
|-id=357 bgcolor=#fefefe
| 575357 ||  || — || September 23, 2011 || Haleakala || Pan-STARRS ||  || align=right data-sort-value="0.49" | 490 m || 
|-id=358 bgcolor=#d6d6d6
| 575358 ||  || — || September 23, 2011 || Haleakala || Pan-STARRS ||  || align=right | 2.1 km || 
|-id=359 bgcolor=#d6d6d6
| 575359 ||  || — || September 19, 2011 || Haleakala || Pan-STARRS ||  || align=right | 2.1 km || 
|-id=360 bgcolor=#d6d6d6
| 575360 ||  || — || October 11, 2006 || Palomar || NEAT ||  || align=right | 2.3 km || 
|-id=361 bgcolor=#fefefe
| 575361 ||  || — || September 4, 2011 || Haleakala || Pan-STARRS ||  || align=right data-sort-value="0.78" | 780 m || 
|-id=362 bgcolor=#d6d6d6
| 575362 ||  || — || October 21, 2006 || Kitt Peak || Spacewatch ||  || align=right | 2.9 km || 
|-id=363 bgcolor=#E9E9E9
| 575363 ||  || — || September 20, 2011 || Mount Lemmon || Mount Lemmon Survey ||  || align=right | 1.8 km || 
|-id=364 bgcolor=#fefefe
| 575364 ||  || — || September 11, 2004 || Kitt Peak || Spacewatch ||  || align=right data-sort-value="0.82" | 820 m || 
|-id=365 bgcolor=#E9E9E9
| 575365 ||  || — || September 20, 2011 || Mount Lemmon || Mount Lemmon Survey ||  || align=right | 1.6 km || 
|-id=366 bgcolor=#d6d6d6
| 575366 ||  || — || September 4, 2011 || Haleakala || Pan-STARRS ||  || align=right | 2.1 km || 
|-id=367 bgcolor=#d6d6d6
| 575367 ||  || — || July 31, 2005 || Palomar || NEAT || EOS || align=right | 2.0 km || 
|-id=368 bgcolor=#d6d6d6
| 575368 ||  || — || September 22, 2011 || Kitt Peak || Spacewatch ||  || align=right | 2.1 km || 
|-id=369 bgcolor=#E9E9E9
| 575369 ||  || — || November 2, 2007 || Mount Lemmon || Mount Lemmon Survey ||  || align=right | 2.0 km || 
|-id=370 bgcolor=#d6d6d6
| 575370 ||  || — || November 2, 2006 || Kitt Peak || Spacewatch ||  || align=right | 1.9 km || 
|-id=371 bgcolor=#d6d6d6
| 575371 ||  || — || September 2, 2011 || Haleakala || Pan-STARRS ||  || align=right | 2.3 km || 
|-id=372 bgcolor=#fefefe
| 575372 ||  || — || September 19, 2011 || Sandlot || G. Hug ||  || align=right data-sort-value="0.69" | 690 m || 
|-id=373 bgcolor=#d6d6d6
| 575373 ||  || — || September 23, 2011 || Charleston || R. Holmes ||  || align=right | 3.1 km || 
|-id=374 bgcolor=#fefefe
| 575374 ||  || — || January 15, 2009 || Kitt Peak || Spacewatch ||  || align=right data-sort-value="0.74" | 740 m || 
|-id=375 bgcolor=#d6d6d6
| 575375 ||  || — || September 20, 2011 || Kitt Peak || Spacewatch ||  || align=right | 2.3 km || 
|-id=376 bgcolor=#d6d6d6
| 575376 ||  || — || September 13, 2005 || Kitt Peak || Spacewatch ||  || align=right | 2.9 km || 
|-id=377 bgcolor=#E9E9E9
| 575377 ||  || — || September 20, 2011 || Kitt Peak || Spacewatch || AGN || align=right data-sort-value="0.95" | 950 m || 
|-id=378 bgcolor=#d6d6d6
| 575378 ||  || — || September 24, 2011 || Kitt Peak || Spacewatch ||  || align=right | 2.2 km || 
|-id=379 bgcolor=#d6d6d6
| 575379 ||  || — || September 24, 2011 || Haleakala || Pan-STARRS ||  || align=right | 2.4 km || 
|-id=380 bgcolor=#d6d6d6
| 575380 ||  || — || September 18, 2011 || Mount Lemmon || Mount Lemmon Survey ||  || align=right | 2.6 km || 
|-id=381 bgcolor=#fefefe
| 575381 ||  || — || October 18, 2001 || Palomar || NEAT ||  || align=right data-sort-value="0.65" | 650 m || 
|-id=382 bgcolor=#d6d6d6
| 575382 ||  || — || September 4, 2011 || Haleakala || Pan-STARRS ||  || align=right | 2.2 km || 
|-id=383 bgcolor=#d6d6d6
| 575383 ||  || — || September 23, 2011 || Haleakala || Pan-STARRS ||  || align=right | 1.9 km || 
|-id=384 bgcolor=#E9E9E9
| 575384 ||  || — || November 7, 2007 || Kitt Peak || Spacewatch ||  || align=right | 1.9 km || 
|-id=385 bgcolor=#d6d6d6
| 575385 ||  || — || September 4, 2011 || Haleakala || Pan-STARRS ||  || align=right | 2.5 km || 
|-id=386 bgcolor=#d6d6d6
| 575386 ||  || — || September 4, 2011 || Haleakala || Pan-STARRS ||  || align=right | 2.3 km || 
|-id=387 bgcolor=#E9E9E9
| 575387 ||  || — || September 26, 2011 || Haleakala || Pan-STARRS ||  || align=right | 1.9 km || 
|-id=388 bgcolor=#d6d6d6
| 575388 ||  || — || September 26, 2011 || Haleakala || Pan-STARRS ||  || align=right | 2.4 km || 
|-id=389 bgcolor=#d6d6d6
| 575389 ||  || — || September 26, 2011 || Haleakala || Pan-STARRS ||  || align=right | 2.5 km || 
|-id=390 bgcolor=#E9E9E9
| 575390 ||  || — || May 12, 2010 || Mount Lemmon || Mount Lemmon Survey ||  || align=right | 1.8 km || 
|-id=391 bgcolor=#d6d6d6
| 575391 ||  || — || September 17, 2006 || Kitt Peak || Spacewatch ||  || align=right | 2.6 km || 
|-id=392 bgcolor=#d6d6d6
| 575392 ||  || — || March 11, 2002 || Palomar || NEAT ||  || align=right | 3.2 km || 
|-id=393 bgcolor=#fefefe
| 575393 ||  || — || September 23, 2011 || Kitt Peak || Spacewatch ||  || align=right data-sort-value="0.67" | 670 m || 
|-id=394 bgcolor=#d6d6d6
| 575394 ||  || — || December 19, 2007 || Mount Lemmon || Mount Lemmon Survey ||  || align=right | 2.7 km || 
|-id=395 bgcolor=#fefefe
| 575395 ||  || — || January 29, 2009 || Kitt Peak || Spacewatch || NYS || align=right data-sort-value="0.48" | 480 m || 
|-id=396 bgcolor=#fefefe
| 575396 ||  || — || September 28, 2011 || Mount Lemmon || Mount Lemmon Survey ||  || align=right data-sort-value="0.59" | 590 m || 
|-id=397 bgcolor=#d6d6d6
| 575397 ||  || — || March 17, 2009 || Bergisch Gladbach || W. Bickel ||  || align=right | 2.8 km || 
|-id=398 bgcolor=#d6d6d6
| 575398 ||  || — || September 29, 2011 || Mount Lemmon || Mount Lemmon Survey ||  || align=right | 2.2 km || 
|-id=399 bgcolor=#d6d6d6
| 575399 ||  || — || February 9, 2008 || Mount Lemmon || Mount Lemmon Survey ||  || align=right | 2.7 km || 
|-id=400 bgcolor=#d6d6d6
| 575400 ||  || — || September 26, 2011 || Kitt Peak || Spacewatch ||  || align=right | 2.7 km || 
|}

575401–575500 

|-bgcolor=#fefefe
| 575401 ||  || — || November 1, 2000 || Socorro || LINEAR ||  || align=right data-sort-value="0.90" | 900 m || 
|-id=402 bgcolor=#d6d6d6
| 575402 ||  || — || September 30, 2006 || Kitt Peak || Spacewatch ||  || align=right | 2.4 km || 
|-id=403 bgcolor=#d6d6d6
| 575403 ||  || — || September 26, 2011 || Mount Lemmon || Mount Lemmon Survey ||  || align=right | 2.5 km || 
|-id=404 bgcolor=#d6d6d6
| 575404 ||  || — || December 20, 2007 || Mount Lemmon || Mount Lemmon Survey ||  || align=right | 2.6 km || 
|-id=405 bgcolor=#d6d6d6
| 575405 ||  || — || September 20, 2011 || Haleakala || Pan-STARRS ||  || align=right | 2.1 km || 
|-id=406 bgcolor=#fefefe
| 575406 ||  || — || September 18, 2011 || Mount Lemmon || Mount Lemmon Survey ||  || align=right data-sort-value="0.57" | 570 m || 
|-id=407 bgcolor=#d6d6d6
| 575407 ||  || — || September 18, 2011 || Mount Lemmon || Mount Lemmon Survey ||  || align=right | 2.8 km || 
|-id=408 bgcolor=#d6d6d6
| 575408 ||  || — || October 3, 2006 || Mount Lemmon || Mount Lemmon Survey ||  || align=right | 2.4 km || 
|-id=409 bgcolor=#d6d6d6
| 575409 ||  || — || September 20, 2011 || Kitt Peak || Spacewatch ||  || align=right | 2.8 km || 
|-id=410 bgcolor=#fefefe
| 575410 ||  || — || September 15, 2007 || Mount Lemmon || Mount Lemmon Survey ||  || align=right data-sort-value="0.71" | 710 m || 
|-id=411 bgcolor=#d6d6d6
| 575411 ||  || — || October 2, 2006 || Mount Lemmon || Mount Lemmon Survey ||  || align=right | 2.3 km || 
|-id=412 bgcolor=#fefefe
| 575412 ||  || — || September 21, 2011 || Kitt Peak || Spacewatch ||  || align=right data-sort-value="0.51" | 510 m || 
|-id=413 bgcolor=#d6d6d6
| 575413 ||  || — || September 21, 2011 || Haleakala || Pan-STARRS ||  || align=right | 2.1 km || 
|-id=414 bgcolor=#d6d6d6
| 575414 ||  || — || August 23, 2011 || Haleakala || Pan-STARRS ||  || align=right | 2.2 km || 
|-id=415 bgcolor=#d6d6d6
| 575415 ||  || — || September 29, 2011 || Mount Lemmon || Mount Lemmon Survey ||  || align=right | 2.5 km || 
|-id=416 bgcolor=#fefefe
| 575416 ||  || — || September 23, 2011 || Kitt Peak || Spacewatch ||  || align=right data-sort-value="0.66" | 660 m || 
|-id=417 bgcolor=#fefefe
| 575417 ||  || — || September 29, 2011 || Mount Lemmon || Mount Lemmon Survey ||  || align=right data-sort-value="0.77" | 770 m || 
|-id=418 bgcolor=#d6d6d6
| 575418 ||  || — || September 29, 2011 || Mount Lemmon || Mount Lemmon Survey ||  || align=right | 2.3 km || 
|-id=419 bgcolor=#d6d6d6
| 575419 ||  || — || September 29, 2011 || Les Engarouines || L. Bernasconi ||  || align=right | 3.1 km || 
|-id=420 bgcolor=#d6d6d6
| 575420 ||  || — || July 30, 2000 || Cerro Tololo || M. W. Buie, S. D. Kern ||  || align=right | 2.6 km || 
|-id=421 bgcolor=#d6d6d6
| 575421 ||  || — || September 26, 2006 || Mount Lemmon || Mount Lemmon Survey ||  || align=right | 2.1 km || 
|-id=422 bgcolor=#d6d6d6
| 575422 ||  || — || September 26, 2011 || Mount Lemmon || Mount Lemmon Survey ||  || align=right | 1.9 km || 
|-id=423 bgcolor=#E9E9E9
| 575423 ||  || — || September 26, 2011 || Haleakala || Pan-STARRS ||  || align=right | 1.8 km || 
|-id=424 bgcolor=#fefefe
| 575424 ||  || — || December 29, 2008 || Kitt Peak || Spacewatch ||  || align=right data-sort-value="0.51" | 510 m || 
|-id=425 bgcolor=#d6d6d6
| 575425 ||  || — || September 29, 2011 || Mount Lemmon || Mount Lemmon Survey ||  || align=right | 2.0 km || 
|-id=426 bgcolor=#d6d6d6
| 575426 ||  || — || August 29, 2005 || Kitt Peak || Spacewatch ||  || align=right | 2.7 km || 
|-id=427 bgcolor=#d6d6d6
| 575427 ||  || — || October 30, 2017 || Haleakala || Pan-STARRS ||  || align=right | 2.0 km || 
|-id=428 bgcolor=#d6d6d6
| 575428 ||  || — || July 31, 2005 || Palomar || NEAT ||  || align=right | 3.2 km || 
|-id=429 bgcolor=#d6d6d6
| 575429 ||  || — || September 25, 2011 || Haleakala || Pan-STARRS ||  || align=right | 2.0 km || 
|-id=430 bgcolor=#d6d6d6
| 575430 ||  || — || September 26, 2011 || Mount Lemmon || Mount Lemmon Survey ||  || align=right | 2.1 km || 
|-id=431 bgcolor=#d6d6d6
| 575431 ||  || — || July 29, 2005 || Palomar || NEAT ||  || align=right | 2.9 km || 
|-id=432 bgcolor=#fefefe
| 575432 ||  || — || September 21, 2011 || Kitt Peak || Spacewatch ||  || align=right data-sort-value="0.78" | 780 m || 
|-id=433 bgcolor=#fefefe
| 575433 ||  || — || September 20, 2011 || Mount Lemmon || Mount Lemmon Survey ||  || align=right data-sort-value="0.65" | 650 m || 
|-id=434 bgcolor=#d6d6d6
| 575434 ||  || — || March 15, 2004 || Kitt Peak || Spacewatch ||  || align=right | 2.7 km || 
|-id=435 bgcolor=#fefefe
| 575435 ||  || — || September 20, 2011 || Kitt Peak || Spacewatch ||  || align=right data-sort-value="0.54" | 540 m || 
|-id=436 bgcolor=#C2FFFF
| 575436 ||  || — || September 20, 2011 || Haleakala || Pan-STARRS || L5 || align=right | 7.1 km || 
|-id=437 bgcolor=#d6d6d6
| 575437 ||  || — || September 4, 2011 || Haleakala || Pan-STARRS ||  || align=right | 2.9 km || 
|-id=438 bgcolor=#d6d6d6
| 575438 ||  || — || October 1, 2000 || Socorro || LINEAR || TIR || align=right | 3.2 km || 
|-id=439 bgcolor=#fefefe
| 575439 ||  || — || September 22, 2011 || Kitt Peak || Spacewatch ||  || align=right data-sort-value="0.64" | 640 m || 
|-id=440 bgcolor=#E9E9E9
| 575440 ||  || — || August 13, 2006 || Palomar || NEAT ||  || align=right | 2.5 km || 
|-id=441 bgcolor=#d6d6d6
| 575441 ||  || — || September 20, 2011 || Mount Lemmon || Mount Lemmon Survey ||  || align=right | 2.9 km || 
|-id=442 bgcolor=#d6d6d6
| 575442 ||  || — || September 19, 2011 || Haleakala || Pan-STARRS ||  || align=right | 1.9 km || 
|-id=443 bgcolor=#d6d6d6
| 575443 ||  || — || September 28, 2011 || Kitt Peak || Spacewatch ||  || align=right | 2.5 km || 
|-id=444 bgcolor=#d6d6d6
| 575444 ||  || — || September 30, 2006 || Mount Lemmon || Mount Lemmon Survey ||  || align=right | 2.3 km || 
|-id=445 bgcolor=#E9E9E9
| 575445 ||  || — || September 23, 2011 || Haleakala || Pan-STARRS ||  || align=right | 1.1 km || 
|-id=446 bgcolor=#d6d6d6
| 575446 ||  || — || April 28, 2009 || Kitt Peak || Spacewatch ||  || align=right | 2.4 km || 
|-id=447 bgcolor=#fefefe
| 575447 ||  || — || September 29, 2011 || Mount Lemmon || Mount Lemmon Survey ||  || align=right data-sort-value="0.75" | 750 m || 
|-id=448 bgcolor=#d6d6d6
| 575448 ||  || — || April 6, 2014 || Mount Lemmon || Mount Lemmon Survey ||  || align=right | 2.7 km || 
|-id=449 bgcolor=#C2FFFF
| 575449 ||  || — || September 19, 2011 || Mount Lemmon || Mount Lemmon Survey || L4 || align=right | 13 km || 
|-id=450 bgcolor=#d6d6d6
| 575450 ||  || — || January 30, 2014 || Kitt Peak || Spacewatch ||  || align=right | 2.3 km || 
|-id=451 bgcolor=#d6d6d6
| 575451 ||  || — || September 20, 2011 || Haleakala || Pan-STARRS ||  || align=right | 1.9 km || 
|-id=452 bgcolor=#d6d6d6
| 575452 ||  || — || August 26, 2016 || Haleakala || Pan-STARRS ||  || align=right | 2.7 km || 
|-id=453 bgcolor=#fefefe
| 575453 ||  || — || September 27, 2011 || Mount Lemmon || Mount Lemmon Survey ||  || align=right data-sort-value="0.88" | 880 m || 
|-id=454 bgcolor=#fefefe
| 575454 ||  || — || September 20, 2011 || Kitt Peak || Spacewatch ||  || align=right data-sort-value="0.50" | 500 m || 
|-id=455 bgcolor=#d6d6d6
| 575455 ||  || — || September 24, 2017 || Haleakala || Pan-STARRS ||  || align=right | 2.2 km || 
|-id=456 bgcolor=#d6d6d6
| 575456 ||  || — || September 30, 2017 || Haleakala || Pan-STARRS ||  || align=right | 2.1 km || 
|-id=457 bgcolor=#E9E9E9
| 575457 ||  || — || September 24, 2011 || Haleakala || Pan-STARRS ||  || align=right | 1.3 km || 
|-id=458 bgcolor=#d6d6d6
| 575458 ||  || — || September 29, 2011 || Mount Lemmon || Mount Lemmon Survey ||  || align=right | 2.2 km || 
|-id=459 bgcolor=#d6d6d6
| 575459 ||  || — || September 26, 2011 || Haleakala || Pan-STARRS ||  || align=right | 1.8 km || 
|-id=460 bgcolor=#d6d6d6
| 575460 ||  || — || September 26, 2011 || Mount Lemmon || Mount Lemmon Survey ||  || align=right | 1.8 km || 
|-id=461 bgcolor=#d6d6d6
| 575461 ||  || — || September 18, 2011 || Mount Lemmon || Mount Lemmon Survey ||  || align=right | 1.9 km || 
|-id=462 bgcolor=#d6d6d6
| 575462 ||  || — || September 27, 2011 || Mount Lemmon || Mount Lemmon Survey ||  || align=right | 2.8 km || 
|-id=463 bgcolor=#d6d6d6
| 575463 ||  || — || April 9, 2003 || Kitt Peak || Spacewatch ||  || align=right | 2.5 km || 
|-id=464 bgcolor=#d6d6d6
| 575464 ||  || — || September 24, 2011 || Mount Lemmon || Mount Lemmon Survey ||  || align=right | 2.0 km || 
|-id=465 bgcolor=#d6d6d6
| 575465 ||  || — || September 23, 2011 || Haleakala || Pan-STARRS ||  || align=right | 2.2 km || 
|-id=466 bgcolor=#d6d6d6
| 575466 ||  || — || September 29, 2011 || Mount Lemmon || Mount Lemmon Survey ||  || align=right | 2.2 km || 
|-id=467 bgcolor=#d6d6d6
| 575467 ||  || — || September 23, 2011 || Mount Lemmon || Mount Lemmon Survey ||  || align=right | 2.2 km || 
|-id=468 bgcolor=#E9E9E9
| 575468 ||  || — || September 25, 2011 || Haleakala || Pan-STARRS ||  || align=right | 1.8 km || 
|-id=469 bgcolor=#d6d6d6
| 575469 ||  || — || September 23, 2011 || Mount Lemmon || Mount Lemmon Survey ||  || align=right | 2.3 km || 
|-id=470 bgcolor=#d6d6d6
| 575470 ||  || — || September 29, 2011 || Mount Lemmon || Mount Lemmon Survey ||  || align=right | 2.2 km || 
|-id=471 bgcolor=#d6d6d6
| 575471 ||  || — || September 29, 2011 || Kitt Peak || Spacewatch ||  || align=right | 2.9 km || 
|-id=472 bgcolor=#d6d6d6
| 575472 ||  || — || September 29, 2011 || Kitt Peak || Spacewatch || 7:4 || align=right | 3.2 km || 
|-id=473 bgcolor=#d6d6d6
| 575473 ||  || — || September 27, 2011 || Mount Lemmon || Mount Lemmon Survey ||  || align=right | 2.4 km || 
|-id=474 bgcolor=#fefefe
| 575474 ||  || — || September 23, 2011 || Haleakala || Pan-STARRS ||  || align=right data-sort-value="0.69" | 690 m || 
|-id=475 bgcolor=#d6d6d6
| 575475 ||  || — || September 24, 2011 || Haleakala || Pan-STARRS ||  || align=right | 2.7 km || 
|-id=476 bgcolor=#d6d6d6
| 575476 ||  || — || September 24, 2011 || Haleakala || Pan-STARRS ||  || align=right | 2.5 km || 
|-id=477 bgcolor=#d6d6d6
| 575477 ||  || — || September 24, 2011 || Mount Lemmon || Mount Lemmon Survey ||  || align=right | 2.0 km || 
|-id=478 bgcolor=#d6d6d6
| 575478 ||  || — || September 30, 2011 || Kitt Peak || Spacewatch ||  || align=right | 2.1 km || 
|-id=479 bgcolor=#d6d6d6
| 575479 ||  || — || September 19, 2011 || Haleakala || Pan-STARRS ||  || align=right | 2.3 km || 
|-id=480 bgcolor=#d6d6d6
| 575480 ||  || — || September 27, 2011 || Mount Lemmon || Mount Lemmon Survey ||  || align=right | 2.6 km || 
|-id=481 bgcolor=#d6d6d6
| 575481 ||  || — || September 26, 2011 || Haleakala || Pan-STARRS ||  || align=right | 2.4 km || 
|-id=482 bgcolor=#d6d6d6
| 575482 ||  || — || September 29, 2011 || Mount Lemmon || Mount Lemmon Survey ||  || align=right | 2.3 km || 
|-id=483 bgcolor=#d6d6d6
| 575483 ||  || — || September 27, 2011 || Mount Lemmon || Mount Lemmon Survey ||  || align=right | 1.8 km || 
|-id=484 bgcolor=#d6d6d6
| 575484 ||  || — || September 19, 2011 || Haleakala || Pan-STARRS ||  || align=right | 2.5 km || 
|-id=485 bgcolor=#d6d6d6
| 575485 ||  || — || September 24, 2011 || Haleakala || Pan-STARRS ||  || align=right | 2.2 km || 
|-id=486 bgcolor=#d6d6d6
| 575486 ||  || — || September 21, 2011 || Mount Lemmon || Mount Lemmon Survey ||  || align=right | 2.3 km || 
|-id=487 bgcolor=#d6d6d6
| 575487 ||  || — || September 23, 2011 || Haleakala || Pan-STARRS ||  || align=right | 2.3 km || 
|-id=488 bgcolor=#d6d6d6
| 575488 ||  || — || September 24, 2011 || Haleakala || Pan-STARRS ||  || align=right | 2.2 km || 
|-id=489 bgcolor=#E9E9E9
| 575489 ||  || — || September 30, 2011 || Kitt Peak || Spacewatch ||  || align=right | 1.5 km || 
|-id=490 bgcolor=#fefefe
| 575490 ||  || — || January 19, 2002 || Anderson Mesa || LONEOS || PHO || align=right | 1.0 km || 
|-id=491 bgcolor=#FA8072
| 575491 ||  || — || June 11, 2011 || Haleakala || Pan-STARRS ||  || align=right data-sort-value="0.78" | 780 m || 
|-id=492 bgcolor=#d6d6d6
| 575492 ||  || — || October 4, 2011 || Crni Vrh || J. Zakrajšek ||  || align=right | 3.0 km || 
|-id=493 bgcolor=#fefefe
| 575493 ||  || — || October 2, 2011 || Cerro Burek || Alianza S4 Obs. ||  || align=right data-sort-value="0.84" | 840 m || 
|-id=494 bgcolor=#fefefe
| 575494 ||  || — || January 18, 2002 || Anderson Mesa || LONEOS || H || align=right data-sort-value="0.84" | 840 m || 
|-id=495 bgcolor=#d6d6d6
| 575495 ||  || — || November 20, 2006 || Kitt Peak || Spacewatch ||  || align=right | 3.5 km || 
|-id=496 bgcolor=#fefefe
| 575496 ||  || — || September 26, 2011 || Haleakala || Pan-STARRS ||  || align=right data-sort-value="0.50" | 500 m || 
|-id=497 bgcolor=#fefefe
| 575497 ||  || — || October 3, 2011 || XuYi || PMO NEO ||  || align=right data-sort-value="0.62" | 620 m || 
|-id=498 bgcolor=#d6d6d6
| 575498 Lampérthgyula ||  ||  || October 5, 2011 || Piszkesteto || K. Sárneczky, T. Szalai ||  || align=right | 2.9 km || 
|-id=499 bgcolor=#d6d6d6
| 575499 ||  || — || August 31, 2005 || Anderson Mesa || LONEOS ||  || align=right | 3.1 km || 
|-id=500 bgcolor=#E9E9E9
| 575500 ||  || — || September 8, 2011 || Kitt Peak || Spacewatch ||  || align=right | 2.1 km || 
|}

575501–575600 

|-bgcolor=#E9E9E9
| 575501 ||  || — || October 3, 2011 || Mount Lemmon || Mount Lemmon Survey ||  || align=right | 1.9 km || 
|-id=502 bgcolor=#E9E9E9
| 575502 ||  || — || October 5, 2011 || Piszkesteto || K. Sárneczky ||  || align=right | 1.9 km || 
|-id=503 bgcolor=#fefefe
| 575503 ||  || — || October 18, 2011 || Haleakala || Pan-STARRS || H || align=right data-sort-value="0.49" | 490 m || 
|-id=504 bgcolor=#fefefe
| 575504 ||  || — || September 23, 2011 || Kitt Peak || Spacewatch ||  || align=right data-sort-value="0.88" | 880 m || 
|-id=505 bgcolor=#fefefe
| 575505 ||  || — || October 1, 2011 || Kitt Peak || Spacewatch ||  || align=right data-sort-value="0.59" | 590 m || 
|-id=506 bgcolor=#d6d6d6
| 575506 ||  || — || August 6, 2005 || Palomar || NEAT ||  || align=right | 2.8 km || 
|-id=507 bgcolor=#E9E9E9
| 575507 ||  || — || October 17, 2011 || Kitt Peak || Spacewatch ||  || align=right | 1.5 km || 
|-id=508 bgcolor=#E9E9E9
| 575508 ||  || — || September 22, 2011 || Kitt Peak || Spacewatch ||  || align=right | 2.2 km || 
|-id=509 bgcolor=#E9E9E9
| 575509 ||  || — || July 14, 2002 || Palomar || NEAT ||  || align=right | 1.0 km || 
|-id=510 bgcolor=#d6d6d6
| 575510 ||  || — || October 17, 2011 || Kitt Peak || Spacewatch ||  || align=right | 2.3 km || 
|-id=511 bgcolor=#d6d6d6
| 575511 Bükk ||  ||  || October 18, 2011 || Piszkesteto || A. Szing ||  || align=right | 2.7 km || 
|-id=512 bgcolor=#fefefe
| 575512 ||  || — || December 21, 2008 || Kitt Peak || Spacewatch ||  || align=right data-sort-value="0.81" | 810 m || 
|-id=513 bgcolor=#fefefe
| 575513 ||  || — || September 22, 2004 || Kitt Peak || Spacewatch ||  || align=right data-sort-value="0.74" | 740 m || 
|-id=514 bgcolor=#d6d6d6
| 575514 ||  || — || September 24, 2011 || Haleakala || Pan-STARRS ||  || align=right | 2.6 km || 
|-id=515 bgcolor=#d6d6d6
| 575515 ||  || — || October 4, 2006 || Mount Lemmon || Mount Lemmon Survey ||  || align=right | 3.1 km || 
|-id=516 bgcolor=#d6d6d6
| 575516 ||  || — || November 16, 2006 || Bergisch Gladbach || W. Bickel || EOS || align=right | 1.8 km || 
|-id=517 bgcolor=#fefefe
| 575517 ||  || — || October 8, 2004 || Kitt Peak || Spacewatch ||  || align=right data-sort-value="0.58" | 580 m || 
|-id=518 bgcolor=#d6d6d6
| 575518 ||  || — || September 21, 2011 || Mount Lemmon || Mount Lemmon Survey ||  || align=right | 2.5 km || 
|-id=519 bgcolor=#d6d6d6
| 575519 ||  || — || December 20, 2006 || Palomar || NEAT ||  || align=right | 3.0 km || 
|-id=520 bgcolor=#d6d6d6
| 575520 ||  || — || November 12, 2006 || Mount Lemmon || Mount Lemmon Survey ||  || align=right | 2.2 km || 
|-id=521 bgcolor=#E9E9E9
| 575521 ||  || — || October 20, 2011 || Mount Lemmon || Mount Lemmon Survey ||  || align=right | 1.3 km || 
|-id=522 bgcolor=#d6d6d6
| 575522 ||  || — || October 3, 2006 || Mount Lemmon || Mount Lemmon Survey ||  || align=right | 2.4 km || 
|-id=523 bgcolor=#d6d6d6
| 575523 ||  || — || October 20, 2011 || Mount Lemmon || Mount Lemmon Survey ||  || align=right | 2.4 km || 
|-id=524 bgcolor=#fefefe
| 575524 ||  || — || February 13, 2009 || Calar Alto || F. Hormuth, J. C. Datson || NYS || align=right data-sort-value="0.44" | 440 m || 
|-id=525 bgcolor=#d6d6d6
| 575525 ||  || — || June 15, 2005 || Mount Lemmon || Mount Lemmon Survey ||  || align=right | 2.6 km || 
|-id=526 bgcolor=#fefefe
| 575526 ||  || — || October 6, 2004 || Palomar || NEAT ||  || align=right data-sort-value="0.73" | 730 m || 
|-id=527 bgcolor=#E9E9E9
| 575527 ||  || — || October 22, 2011 || Mount Lemmon || Mount Lemmon Survey ||  || align=right | 1.8 km || 
|-id=528 bgcolor=#E9E9E9
| 575528 ||  || — || October 22, 2011 || Mount Lemmon || Mount Lemmon Survey ||  || align=right | 1.9 km || 
|-id=529 bgcolor=#fefefe
| 575529 ||  || — || October 7, 2004 || Anderson Mesa || LONEOS ||  || align=right data-sort-value="0.71" | 710 m || 
|-id=530 bgcolor=#d6d6d6
| 575530 ||  || — || April 20, 2004 || Kitt Peak || Spacewatch ||  || align=right | 2.9 km || 
|-id=531 bgcolor=#d6d6d6
| 575531 ||  || — || August 30, 2005 || Kitt Peak || Spacewatch ||  || align=right | 2.9 km || 
|-id=532 bgcolor=#fefefe
| 575532 ||  || — || October 19, 2011 || Kitt Peak || Spacewatch ||  || align=right data-sort-value="0.71" | 710 m || 
|-id=533 bgcolor=#fefefe
| 575533 ||  || — || March 20, 2010 || Kitt Peak || Spacewatch ||  || align=right data-sort-value="0.77" | 770 m || 
|-id=534 bgcolor=#d6d6d6
| 575534 ||  || — || October 19, 2011 || Kitt Peak || Spacewatch ||  || align=right | 2.5 km || 
|-id=535 bgcolor=#fefefe
| 575535 ||  || — || October 23, 2004 || Kitt Peak || Spacewatch ||  || align=right data-sort-value="0.61" | 610 m || 
|-id=536 bgcolor=#d6d6d6
| 575536 ||  || — || September 23, 2011 || Mount Lemmon || Mount Lemmon Survey ||  || align=right | 2.1 km || 
|-id=537 bgcolor=#d6d6d6
| 575537 ||  || — || October 6, 2011 || Crni Vrh || J. Skvarč ||  || align=right | 2.7 km || 
|-id=538 bgcolor=#d6d6d6
| 575538 ||  || — || October 19, 2011 || Kitt Peak || Spacewatch ||  || align=right | 3.2 km || 
|-id=539 bgcolor=#d6d6d6
| 575539 ||  || — || January 14, 2002 || Palomar || NEAT ||  || align=right | 3.0 km || 
|-id=540 bgcolor=#d6d6d6
| 575540 ||  || — || October 18, 2011 || Kitt Peak || Spacewatch ||  || align=right | 2.4 km || 
|-id=541 bgcolor=#fefefe
| 575541 ||  || — || October 18, 2011 || Mount Lemmon || Mount Lemmon Survey ||  || align=right data-sort-value="0.64" | 640 m || 
|-id=542 bgcolor=#fefefe
| 575542 ||  || — || October 19, 2011 || Mount Lemmon || Mount Lemmon Survey ||  || align=right data-sort-value="0.33" | 330 m || 
|-id=543 bgcolor=#d6d6d6
| 575543 ||  || — || October 19, 2011 || Mount Lemmon || Mount Lemmon Survey ||  || align=right | 2.2 km || 
|-id=544 bgcolor=#d6d6d6
| 575544 ||  || — || October 21, 2006 || Kitt Peak || Spacewatch ||  || align=right | 2.4 km || 
|-id=545 bgcolor=#d6d6d6
| 575545 ||  || — || October 20, 2011 || Kitt Peak || Spacewatch ||  || align=right | 3.0 km || 
|-id=546 bgcolor=#d6d6d6
| 575546 ||  || — || March 5, 2002 || Apache Point || SDSS Collaboration || HYG || align=right | 2.7 km || 
|-id=547 bgcolor=#fefefe
| 575547 ||  || — || October 20, 2011 || Mount Lemmon || Mount Lemmon Survey ||  || align=right data-sort-value="0.68" | 680 m || 
|-id=548 bgcolor=#fefefe
| 575548 ||  || — || October 22, 2011 || Mount Lemmon || Mount Lemmon Survey || MAS || align=right data-sort-value="0.47" | 470 m || 
|-id=549 bgcolor=#fefefe
| 575549 ||  || — || April 14, 2010 || Mount Lemmon || Mount Lemmon Survey ||  || align=right data-sort-value="0.90" | 900 m || 
|-id=550 bgcolor=#d6d6d6
| 575550 ||  || — || October 5, 2011 || Piszkesteto || K. Sárneczky ||  || align=right | 2.5 km || 
|-id=551 bgcolor=#FA8072
| 575551 ||  || — || November 16, 2006 || Catalina || CSS || H || align=right data-sort-value="0.69" | 690 m || 
|-id=552 bgcolor=#fefefe
| 575552 ||  || — || October 23, 2011 || Haleakala || Pan-STARRS || H || align=right data-sort-value="0.62" | 620 m || 
|-id=553 bgcolor=#d6d6d6
| 575553 ||  || — || February 12, 2008 || Mount Lemmon || Mount Lemmon Survey ||  || align=right | 2.6 km || 
|-id=554 bgcolor=#d6d6d6
| 575554 ||  || — || October 4, 2006 || Mount Lemmon || Mount Lemmon Survey || EOS || align=right | 1.4 km || 
|-id=555 bgcolor=#fefefe
| 575555 ||  || — || August 23, 2007 || Kitt Peak || Spacewatch || NYS || align=right data-sort-value="0.47" | 470 m || 
|-id=556 bgcolor=#d6d6d6
| 575556 ||  || — || October 11, 2001 || Palomar || NEAT ||  || align=right | 2.8 km || 
|-id=557 bgcolor=#d6d6d6
| 575557 ||  || — || October 20, 2006 || Palomar || NEAT ||  || align=right | 2.3 km || 
|-id=558 bgcolor=#E9E9E9
| 575558 ||  || — || September 22, 2011 || Kitt Peak || Spacewatch ||  || align=right | 1.3 km || 
|-id=559 bgcolor=#fefefe
| 575559 ||  || — || October 18, 2011 || Mount Lemmon || Mount Lemmon Survey ||  || align=right data-sort-value="0.62" | 620 m || 
|-id=560 bgcolor=#d6d6d6
| 575560 ||  || — || November 3, 2000 || Kitt Peak || Spacewatch ||  || align=right | 3.2 km || 
|-id=561 bgcolor=#fefefe
| 575561 ||  || — || September 26, 2011 || Kitt Peak || Spacewatch ||  || align=right data-sort-value="0.78" | 780 m || 
|-id=562 bgcolor=#d6d6d6
| 575562 ||  || — || November 23, 2006 || Mount Lemmon || Mount Lemmon Survey ||  || align=right | 2.2 km || 
|-id=563 bgcolor=#d6d6d6
| 575563 ||  || — || October 19, 2006 || Kitt Peak || L. H. Wasserman || THM || align=right | 1.9 km || 
|-id=564 bgcolor=#fefefe
| 575564 ||  || — || September 26, 2011 || Haleakala || Pan-STARRS ||  || align=right data-sort-value="0.77" | 770 m || 
|-id=565 bgcolor=#fefefe
| 575565 ||  || — || October 20, 2011 || Mount Lemmon || Mount Lemmon Survey ||  || align=right data-sort-value="0.62" | 620 m || 
|-id=566 bgcolor=#d6d6d6
| 575566 ||  || — || October 20, 2011 || Kitt Peak || Spacewatch ||  || align=right | 2.4 km || 
|-id=567 bgcolor=#E9E9E9
| 575567 ||  || — || October 21, 2011 || Mount Lemmon || Mount Lemmon Survey ||  || align=right | 1.9 km || 
|-id=568 bgcolor=#d6d6d6
| 575568 ||  || — || September 20, 2011 || Kitt Peak || Spacewatch ||  || align=right | 2.1 km || 
|-id=569 bgcolor=#d6d6d6
| 575569 ||  || — || October 20, 2011 || Mount Lemmon || Mount Lemmon Survey ||  || align=right | 2.1 km || 
|-id=570 bgcolor=#fefefe
| 575570 ||  || — || October 23, 2004 || Kitt Peak || Spacewatch || (2076) || align=right data-sort-value="0.88" | 880 m || 
|-id=571 bgcolor=#fefefe
| 575571 ||  || — || October 19, 2011 || Kitt Peak || Spacewatch ||  || align=right data-sort-value="0.79" | 790 m || 
|-id=572 bgcolor=#d6d6d6
| 575572 ||  || — || October 21, 2011 || Kitt Peak || Spacewatch ||  || align=right | 2.9 km || 
|-id=573 bgcolor=#d6d6d6
| 575573 ||  || — || October 21, 2011 || Kitt Peak || Spacewatch ||  || align=right | 2.5 km || 
|-id=574 bgcolor=#fefefe
| 575574 ||  || — || October 21, 2011 || Piszkesteto || K. Sárneczky || V || align=right data-sort-value="0.68" | 680 m || 
|-id=575 bgcolor=#d6d6d6
| 575575 ||  || — || June 13, 2004 || Kitt Peak || Spacewatch || EOS || align=right | 2.8 km || 
|-id=576 bgcolor=#fefefe
| 575576 ||  || — || October 24, 2011 || Kitt Peak || Spacewatch ||  || align=right data-sort-value="0.82" | 820 m || 
|-id=577 bgcolor=#fefefe
| 575577 ||  || — || July 8, 2003 || Palomar || NEAT ||  || align=right data-sort-value="0.85" | 850 m || 
|-id=578 bgcolor=#d6d6d6
| 575578 ||  || — || October 22, 2011 || Kitt Peak || Spacewatch ||  || align=right | 2.6 km || 
|-id=579 bgcolor=#d6d6d6
| 575579 ||  || — || September 4, 2011 || Haleakala || Pan-STARRS ||  || align=right | 2.2 km || 
|-id=580 bgcolor=#fefefe
| 575580 ||  || — || November 19, 2008 || Kitt Peak || Spacewatch ||  || align=right data-sort-value="0.71" | 710 m || 
|-id=581 bgcolor=#fefefe
| 575581 ||  || — || March 20, 1999 || Apache Point || SDSS Collaboration ||  || align=right data-sort-value="0.77" | 770 m || 
|-id=582 bgcolor=#fefefe
| 575582 ||  || — || August 18, 2004 || La Palma-NEON || NEON ||  || align=right data-sort-value="0.90" | 900 m || 
|-id=583 bgcolor=#d6d6d6
| 575583 ||  || — || October 24, 2011 || Mount Lemmon || Mount Lemmon Survey ||  || align=right | 2.1 km || 
|-id=584 bgcolor=#d6d6d6
| 575584 ||  || — || August 26, 2005 || Palomar || NEAT || EOS || align=right | 2.0 km || 
|-id=585 bgcolor=#fefefe
| 575585 ||  || — || January 31, 2009 || Mount Lemmon || Mount Lemmon Survey ||  || align=right data-sort-value="0.62" | 620 m || 
|-id=586 bgcolor=#fefefe
| 575586 ||  || — || February 13, 2002 || Apache Point || SDSS Collaboration ||  || align=right data-sort-value="0.83" | 830 m || 
|-id=587 bgcolor=#d6d6d6
| 575587 ||  || — || October 24, 2011 || Mount Lemmon || Mount Lemmon Survey ||  || align=right | 2.7 km || 
|-id=588 bgcolor=#fefefe
| 575588 ||  || — || October 19, 2011 || Kitt Peak || Spacewatch || V || align=right data-sort-value="0.65" | 650 m || 
|-id=589 bgcolor=#fefefe
| 575589 ||  || — || March 26, 2006 || Kitt Peak || Spacewatch ||  || align=right data-sort-value="0.85" | 850 m || 
|-id=590 bgcolor=#d6d6d6
| 575590 ||  || — || September 2, 2011 || Haleakala || Pan-STARRS ||  || align=right | 2.3 km || 
|-id=591 bgcolor=#fefefe
| 575591 ||  || — || October 21, 2011 || Haleakala || Pan-STARRS ||  || align=right data-sort-value="0.80" | 800 m || 
|-id=592 bgcolor=#d6d6d6
| 575592 ||  || — || October 21, 2011 || Haleakala || Pan-STARRS ||  || align=right | 3.5 km || 
|-id=593 bgcolor=#d6d6d6
| 575593 ||  || — || October 25, 2005 || Mount Lemmon || Mount Lemmon Survey ||  || align=right | 2.9 km || 
|-id=594 bgcolor=#d6d6d6
| 575594 ||  || — || August 30, 2005 || Palomar || NEAT ||  || align=right | 3.3 km || 
|-id=595 bgcolor=#d6d6d6
| 575595 ||  || — || October 24, 2011 || Kitt Peak || Spacewatch ||  || align=right | 2.5 km || 
|-id=596 bgcolor=#d6d6d6
| 575596 ||  || — || October 5, 2005 || Catalina || CSS || EOS || align=right | 2.3 km || 
|-id=597 bgcolor=#d6d6d6
| 575597 ||  || — || August 26, 2005 || Palomar || NEAT || EOS || align=right | 2.5 km || 
|-id=598 bgcolor=#fefefe
| 575598 ||  || — || November 9, 2004 || Catalina || CSS ||  || align=right data-sort-value="0.86" | 860 m || 
|-id=599 bgcolor=#fefefe
| 575599 ||  || — || January 9, 2002 || Whipple || T. B. Spahr, M. Schroedter ||  || align=right data-sort-value="0.81" | 810 m || 
|-id=600 bgcolor=#d6d6d6
| 575600 ||  || — || October 21, 2011 || Kitt Peak || Spacewatch ||  || align=right | 2.4 km || 
|}

575601–575700 

|-bgcolor=#d6d6d6
| 575601 ||  || — || October 21, 2011 || Kitt Peak || Spacewatch ||  || align=right | 2.2 km || 
|-id=602 bgcolor=#d6d6d6
| 575602 ||  || — || October 19, 2011 || Kitt Peak || Spacewatch ||  || align=right | 2.4 km || 
|-id=603 bgcolor=#fefefe
| 575603 ||  || — || October 21, 2011 || Kitt Peak || Spacewatch || V || align=right data-sort-value="0.56" | 560 m || 
|-id=604 bgcolor=#fefefe
| 575604 ||  || — || November 11, 2004 || Kitt Peak || Spacewatch ||  || align=right data-sort-value="0.69" | 690 m || 
|-id=605 bgcolor=#d6d6d6
| 575605 ||  || — || September 1, 2005 || Palomar || NEAT || EOS || align=right | 2.1 km || 
|-id=606 bgcolor=#d6d6d6
| 575606 ||  || — || October 1, 2011 || Mount Lemmon || Mount Lemmon Survey ||  || align=right | 2.9 km || 
|-id=607 bgcolor=#d6d6d6
| 575607 ||  || — || February 13, 2002 || Apache Point || SDSS Collaboration ||  || align=right | 3.4 km || 
|-id=608 bgcolor=#d6d6d6
| 575608 ||  || — || October 18, 2011 || Kitt Peak || Spacewatch ||  || align=right | 2.4 km || 
|-id=609 bgcolor=#d6d6d6
| 575609 ||  || — || October 21, 2011 || Mount Lemmon || Mount Lemmon Survey ||  || align=right | 2.7 km || 
|-id=610 bgcolor=#d6d6d6
| 575610 ||  || — || August 8, 2005 || Cerro Tololo || Cerro Tololo Obs. ||  || align=right | 2.2 km || 
|-id=611 bgcolor=#d6d6d6
| 575611 ||  || — || October 24, 2011 || Mount Lemmon || Mount Lemmon Survey ||  || align=right | 2.7 km || 
|-id=612 bgcolor=#fefefe
| 575612 ||  || — || March 16, 2010 || Mount Lemmon || Mount Lemmon Survey ||  || align=right data-sort-value="0.69" | 690 m || 
|-id=613 bgcolor=#d6d6d6
| 575613 ||  || — || September 23, 2011 || Kitt Peak || Spacewatch ||  || align=right | 2.3 km || 
|-id=614 bgcolor=#d6d6d6
| 575614 ||  || — || September 24, 2011 || Bergisch Gladbach || W. Bickel ||  || align=right | 2.1 km || 
|-id=615 bgcolor=#d6d6d6
| 575615 ||  || — || October 24, 2011 || Mount Lemmon || Mount Lemmon Survey ||  || align=right | 2.4 km || 
|-id=616 bgcolor=#d6d6d6
| 575616 ||  || — || October 22, 2011 || Mount Lemmon || Mount Lemmon Survey ||  || align=right | 2.0 km || 
|-id=617 bgcolor=#d6d6d6
| 575617 ||  || — || July 16, 2005 || Kitt Peak || Spacewatch ||  || align=right | 2.3 km || 
|-id=618 bgcolor=#d6d6d6
| 575618 ||  || — || October 24, 2011 || Mount Lemmon || Mount Lemmon Survey ||  || align=right | 2.0 km || 
|-id=619 bgcolor=#fefefe
| 575619 ||  || — || October 24, 2011 || Mount Lemmon || Mount Lemmon Survey ||  || align=right data-sort-value="0.68" | 680 m || 
|-id=620 bgcolor=#d6d6d6
| 575620 ||  || — || May 28, 2004 || Kitt Peak || Spacewatch ||  || align=right | 2.4 km || 
|-id=621 bgcolor=#d6d6d6
| 575621 ||  || — || October 24, 2011 || Mount Lemmon || Mount Lemmon Survey ||  || align=right | 2.4 km || 
|-id=622 bgcolor=#fefefe
| 575622 ||  || — || September 12, 2007 || Mount Lemmon || Mount Lemmon Survey ||  || align=right data-sort-value="0.62" | 620 m || 
|-id=623 bgcolor=#fefefe
| 575623 ||  || — || September 12, 2007 || Mount Lemmon || Mount Lemmon Survey ||  || align=right data-sort-value="0.73" | 730 m || 
|-id=624 bgcolor=#fefefe
| 575624 ||  || — || September 11, 2004 || Kitt Peak || Spacewatch ||  || align=right data-sort-value="0.55" | 550 m || 
|-id=625 bgcolor=#d6d6d6
| 575625 ||  || — || October 18, 2011 || Mount Lemmon || Mount Lemmon Survey ||  || align=right | 2.1 km || 
|-id=626 bgcolor=#d6d6d6
| 575626 ||  || — || October 26, 2011 || Kitt Peak || Spacewatch ||  || align=right | 2.2 km || 
|-id=627 bgcolor=#fefefe
| 575627 ||  || — || June 1, 2003 || Cerro Tololo || M. W. Buie, K. J. Meech || NYS || align=right data-sort-value="0.67" | 670 m || 
|-id=628 bgcolor=#d6d6d6
| 575628 ||  || — || March 11, 2008 || Mount Lemmon || Mount Lemmon Survey ||  || align=right | 3.0 km || 
|-id=629 bgcolor=#d6d6d6
| 575629 ||  || — || October 26, 2011 || Haleakala || Pan-STARRS ||  || align=right | 2.6 km || 
|-id=630 bgcolor=#fefefe
| 575630 ||  || — || October 20, 2011 || Mount Lemmon || Mount Lemmon Survey || V || align=right data-sort-value="0.42" | 420 m || 
|-id=631 bgcolor=#d6d6d6
| 575631 ||  || — || October 23, 2011 || Kitt Peak || Spacewatch ||  || align=right | 2.3 km || 
|-id=632 bgcolor=#d6d6d6
| 575632 ||  || — || October 24, 2011 || Haleakala || Pan-STARRS ||  || align=right | 2.6 km || 
|-id=633 bgcolor=#d6d6d6
| 575633 ||  || — || September 27, 2011 || Mount Lemmon || Mount Lemmon Survey ||  || align=right | 2.3 km || 
|-id=634 bgcolor=#d6d6d6
| 575634 ||  || — || March 31, 2009 || Mount Lemmon || Mount Lemmon Survey ||  || align=right | 3.4 km || 
|-id=635 bgcolor=#d6d6d6
| 575635 ||  || — || September 27, 2011 || Mount Lemmon || Mount Lemmon Survey ||  || align=right | 2.3 km || 
|-id=636 bgcolor=#d6d6d6
| 575636 ||  || — || September 27, 2006 || Catalina || CSS ||  || align=right | 3.0 km || 
|-id=637 bgcolor=#d6d6d6
| 575637 ||  || — || August 26, 2011 || Piszkesteto || K. Sárneczky ||  || align=right | 3.2 km || 
|-id=638 bgcolor=#d6d6d6
| 575638 ||  || — || September 3, 2010 || Mount Lemmon || Mount Lemmon Survey ||  || align=right | 3.0 km || 
|-id=639 bgcolor=#fefefe
| 575639 ||  || — || January 19, 2005 || Kitt Peak || Spacewatch ||  || align=right data-sort-value="0.65" | 650 m || 
|-id=640 bgcolor=#fefefe
| 575640 ||  || — || November 11, 2004 || Kitt Peak || Spacewatch ||  || align=right data-sort-value="0.52" | 520 m || 
|-id=641 bgcolor=#d6d6d6
| 575641 ||  || — || March 29, 2008 || Catalina || CSS ||  || align=right | 3.1 km || 
|-id=642 bgcolor=#fefefe
| 575642 ||  || — || May 14, 2010 || Mount Lemmon || Mount Lemmon Survey ||  || align=right data-sort-value="0.91" | 910 m || 
|-id=643 bgcolor=#d6d6d6
| 575643 ||  || — || October 20, 2011 || Mount Lemmon || Mount Lemmon Survey ||  || align=right | 2.9 km || 
|-id=644 bgcolor=#d6d6d6
| 575644 ||  || — || December 31, 2007 || Kitt Peak || Spacewatch ||  || align=right | 2.7 km || 
|-id=645 bgcolor=#fefefe
| 575645 ||  || — || September 24, 2011 || Haleakala || Pan-STARRS ||  || align=right data-sort-value="0.94" | 940 m || 
|-id=646 bgcolor=#fefefe
| 575646 ||  || — || January 2, 2009 || Mount Lemmon || Mount Lemmon Survey ||  || align=right data-sort-value="0.58" | 580 m || 
|-id=647 bgcolor=#E9E9E9
| 575647 ||  || — || October 23, 2011 || Mount Lemmon || Mount Lemmon Survey ||  || align=right | 1.9 km || 
|-id=648 bgcolor=#d6d6d6
| 575648 ||  || — || July 12, 2005 || Mount Lemmon || Mount Lemmon Survey ||  || align=right | 2.1 km || 
|-id=649 bgcolor=#fefefe
| 575649 ||  || — || October 14, 2007 || Mount Lemmon || Mount Lemmon Survey ||  || align=right data-sort-value="0.72" | 720 m || 
|-id=650 bgcolor=#fefefe
| 575650 ||  || — || October 23, 2004 || Kitt Peak || Spacewatch ||  || align=right data-sort-value="0.74" | 740 m || 
|-id=651 bgcolor=#d6d6d6
| 575651 ||  || — || August 30, 2005 || Campo Imperatore || A. Boattini || TIR || align=right | 2.4 km || 
|-id=652 bgcolor=#d6d6d6
| 575652 ||  || — || October 2, 2006 || Mount Lemmon || Mount Lemmon Survey ||  || align=right | 2.2 km || 
|-id=653 bgcolor=#d6d6d6
| 575653 ||  || — || October 4, 2011 || Piszkesteto || K. Sárneczky ||  || align=right | 2.9 km || 
|-id=654 bgcolor=#d6d6d6
| 575654 ||  || — || October 31, 2011 || Mayhill-ISON || L. Elenin ||  || align=right | 1.9 km || 
|-id=655 bgcolor=#fefefe
| 575655 ||  || — || October 23, 2011 || Mount Lemmon || Mount Lemmon Survey ||  || align=right data-sort-value="0.66" | 660 m || 
|-id=656 bgcolor=#d6d6d6
| 575656 ||  || — || October 1, 2011 || Sternwarte Hagen || M. Klein ||  || align=right | 2.7 km || 
|-id=657 bgcolor=#fefefe
| 575657 ||  || — || October 23, 2011 || Mount Lemmon || Mount Lemmon Survey ||  || align=right data-sort-value="0.60" | 600 m || 
|-id=658 bgcolor=#fefefe
| 575658 ||  || — || December 20, 2004 || Mount Lemmon || Mount Lemmon Survey || MAS || align=right data-sort-value="0.63" | 630 m || 
|-id=659 bgcolor=#d6d6d6
| 575659 ||  || — || October 22, 2011 || Kitt Peak || Spacewatch ||  || align=right | 2.5 km || 
|-id=660 bgcolor=#fefefe
| 575660 ||  || — || October 18, 2011 || Kitt Peak || Spacewatch ||  || align=right data-sort-value="0.61" | 610 m || 
|-id=661 bgcolor=#d6d6d6
| 575661 ||  || — || October 30, 2011 || Kitt Peak || Spacewatch ||  || align=right | 2.5 km || 
|-id=662 bgcolor=#d6d6d6
| 575662 ||  || — || July 30, 2005 || Palomar || NEAT ||  || align=right | 4.2 km || 
|-id=663 bgcolor=#d6d6d6
| 575663 ||  || — || October 30, 2011 || Kitt Peak || Spacewatch ||  || align=right | 2.6 km || 
|-id=664 bgcolor=#fefefe
| 575664 ||  || — || October 24, 2011 || Haleakala || Pan-STARRS ||  || align=right data-sort-value="0.50" | 500 m || 
|-id=665 bgcolor=#d6d6d6
| 575665 ||  || — || October 22, 2011 || Kitt Peak || Spacewatch ||  || align=right | 2.7 km || 
|-id=666 bgcolor=#d6d6d6
| 575666 ||  || — || October 18, 2011 || Haleakala || Pan-STARRS ||  || align=right | 3.2 km || 
|-id=667 bgcolor=#fefefe
| 575667 ||  || — || January 20, 2009 || Kitt Peak || Spacewatch ||  || align=right data-sort-value="0.54" | 540 m || 
|-id=668 bgcolor=#d6d6d6
| 575668 ||  || — || October 22, 2011 || Mount Lemmon || Mount Lemmon Survey ||  || align=right | 1.8 km || 
|-id=669 bgcolor=#d6d6d6
| 575669 ||  || — || November 16, 2006 || Kitt Peak || Spacewatch || EOS || align=right | 1.5 km || 
|-id=670 bgcolor=#d6d6d6
| 575670 ||  || — || October 24, 2011 || Haleakala || Pan-STARRS ||  || align=right | 2.0 km || 
|-id=671 bgcolor=#d6d6d6
| 575671 ||  || — || October 31, 2011 || Mount Lemmon || Mount Lemmon Survey ||  || align=right | 2.4 km || 
|-id=672 bgcolor=#E9E9E9
| 575672 ||  || — || September 14, 1998 || Kitt Peak || Spacewatch ||  || align=right | 1.2 km || 
|-id=673 bgcolor=#d6d6d6
| 575673 ||  || — || September 26, 2011 || Kitt Peak || Spacewatch ||  || align=right | 1.9 km || 
|-id=674 bgcolor=#d6d6d6
| 575674 ||  || — || November 19, 2006 || Kitt Peak || Spacewatch ||  || align=right | 1.9 km || 
|-id=675 bgcolor=#E9E9E9
| 575675 ||  || — || September 21, 2011 || Kitt Peak || Spacewatch ||  || align=right | 1.8 km || 
|-id=676 bgcolor=#d6d6d6
| 575676 ||  || — || October 22, 2006 || Palomar || NEAT ||  || align=right | 3.2 km || 
|-id=677 bgcolor=#d6d6d6
| 575677 ||  || — || September 28, 2006 || Mount Lemmon || Mount Lemmon Survey ||  || align=right | 2.0 km || 
|-id=678 bgcolor=#d6d6d6
| 575678 ||  || — || September 26, 2011 || Kitt Peak || Spacewatch ||  || align=right | 2.2 km || 
|-id=679 bgcolor=#d6d6d6
| 575679 ||  || — || October 19, 2011 || Mount Lemmon || Mount Lemmon Survey ||  || align=right | 2.3 km || 
|-id=680 bgcolor=#d6d6d6
| 575680 ||  || — || October 19, 2011 || Kitt Peak || Spacewatch ||  || align=right | 2.9 km || 
|-id=681 bgcolor=#d6d6d6
| 575681 ||  || — || September 25, 2011 || Eskridge || E. Dose ||  || align=right | 3.5 km || 
|-id=682 bgcolor=#d6d6d6
| 575682 ||  || — || October 20, 2011 || Mount Lemmon || Mount Lemmon Survey ||  || align=right | 3.2 km || 
|-id=683 bgcolor=#d6d6d6
| 575683 ||  || — || September 25, 2011 || Haleakala || Pan-STARRS ||  || align=right | 2.7 km || 
|-id=684 bgcolor=#fefefe
| 575684 ||  || — || October 20, 2011 || Mount Lemmon || Mount Lemmon Survey ||  || align=right data-sort-value="0.58" | 580 m || 
|-id=685 bgcolor=#d6d6d6
| 575685 ||  || — || September 28, 2011 || Mount Lemmon || Mount Lemmon Survey ||  || align=right | 2.4 km || 
|-id=686 bgcolor=#fefefe
| 575686 ||  || — || December 31, 2008 || Kitt Peak || Spacewatch ||  || align=right data-sort-value="0.83" | 830 m || 
|-id=687 bgcolor=#d6d6d6
| 575687 ||  || — || October 22, 2011 || Mount Lemmon || Mount Lemmon Survey ||  || align=right | 2.5 km || 
|-id=688 bgcolor=#d6d6d6
| 575688 ||  || — || October 22, 2011 || Mount Lemmon || Mount Lemmon Survey ||  || align=right | 3.1 km || 
|-id=689 bgcolor=#d6d6d6
| 575689 ||  || — || March 26, 2003 || Kitt Peak || Spacewatch ||  || align=right | 2.7 km || 
|-id=690 bgcolor=#d6d6d6
| 575690 ||  || — || February 16, 2002 || Palomar || NEAT ||  || align=right | 2.6 km || 
|-id=691 bgcolor=#d6d6d6
| 575691 ||  || — || March 28, 2009 || Kitt Peak || Spacewatch ||  || align=right | 3.5 km || 
|-id=692 bgcolor=#E9E9E9
| 575692 ||  || — || December 17, 2007 || Mount Lemmon || Mount Lemmon Survey ||  || align=right | 1.3 km || 
|-id=693 bgcolor=#fefefe
| 575693 ||  || — || March 15, 2010 || Mount Lemmon || Mount Lemmon Survey ||  || align=right data-sort-value="0.72" | 720 m || 
|-id=694 bgcolor=#fefefe
| 575694 ||  || — || February 22, 2009 || Kitt Peak || Spacewatch ||  || align=right data-sort-value="0.65" | 650 m || 
|-id=695 bgcolor=#d6d6d6
| 575695 ||  || — || August 25, 2005 || Palomar || NEAT ||  || align=right | 2.5 km || 
|-id=696 bgcolor=#d6d6d6
| 575696 ||  || — || April 8, 2008 || Mount Lemmon || Mount Lemmon Survey ||  || align=right | 2.4 km || 
|-id=697 bgcolor=#d6d6d6
| 575697 ||  || — || August 30, 2005 || Kitt Peak || Spacewatch ||  || align=right | 3.3 km || 
|-id=698 bgcolor=#fefefe
| 575698 ||  || — || February 13, 2002 || Apache Point || SDSS Collaboration ||  || align=right data-sort-value="0.80" | 800 m || 
|-id=699 bgcolor=#d6d6d6
| 575699 ||  || — || November 24, 2006 || Kitt Peak || Spacewatch ||  || align=right | 2.9 km || 
|-id=700 bgcolor=#fefefe
| 575700 ||  || — || October 25, 2011 || Haleakala || Pan-STARRS ||  || align=right data-sort-value="0.86" | 860 m || 
|}

575701–575800 

|-bgcolor=#d6d6d6
| 575701 ||  || — || October 25, 2011 || Haleakala || Pan-STARRS ||  || align=right | 2.1 km || 
|-id=702 bgcolor=#d6d6d6
| 575702 ||  || — || October 25, 2011 || Haleakala || Pan-STARRS ||  || align=right | 2.4 km || 
|-id=703 bgcolor=#d6d6d6
| 575703 ||  || — || October 25, 2011 || Haleakala || Pan-STARRS ||  || align=right | 2.3 km || 
|-id=704 bgcolor=#d6d6d6
| 575704 ||  || — || July 8, 2005 || Kitt Peak || Spacewatch ||  || align=right | 3.4 km || 
|-id=705 bgcolor=#d6d6d6
| 575705 ||  || — || August 26, 2005 || Palomar || NEAT ||  || align=right | 2.8 km || 
|-id=706 bgcolor=#d6d6d6
| 575706 ||  || — || August 27, 2005 || Palomar || NEAT ||  || align=right | 4.5 km || 
|-id=707 bgcolor=#d6d6d6
| 575707 ||  || — || February 13, 2008 || Mount Lemmon || Mount Lemmon Survey ||  || align=right | 2.3 km || 
|-id=708 bgcolor=#d6d6d6
| 575708 ||  || — || September 24, 2011 || Haleakala || Pan-STARRS ||  || align=right | 2.1 km || 
|-id=709 bgcolor=#d6d6d6
| 575709 ||  || — || October 31, 2011 || Mount Lemmon || Mount Lemmon Survey ||  || align=right | 2.0 km || 
|-id=710 bgcolor=#d6d6d6
| 575710 ||  || — || October 29, 2000 || Kitt Peak || Spacewatch || EOS || align=right | 1.8 km || 
|-id=711 bgcolor=#E9E9E9
| 575711 ||  || — || October 12, 2007 || Kitt Peak || Spacewatch ||  || align=right data-sort-value="0.65" | 650 m || 
|-id=712 bgcolor=#fefefe
| 575712 ||  || — || October 19, 2011 || Kitt Peak || Spacewatch ||  || align=right data-sort-value="0.75" | 750 m || 
|-id=713 bgcolor=#C2E0FF
| 575713 ||  || — || August 29, 2011 || Mauna Kea || Mauna Kea Obs. || plutino || align=right | 304 km || 
|-id=714 bgcolor=#fefefe
| 575714 ||  || — || October 24, 2011 || Mount Lemmon || Mount Lemmon Survey ||  || align=right data-sort-value="0.66" | 660 m || 
|-id=715 bgcolor=#d6d6d6
| 575715 ||  || — || October 24, 2011 || Haleakala || Pan-STARRS || 7:4 || align=right | 2.8 km || 
|-id=716 bgcolor=#d6d6d6
| 575716 ||  || — || February 24, 2014 || Haleakala || Pan-STARRS ||  || align=right | 2.6 km || 
|-id=717 bgcolor=#d6d6d6
| 575717 ||  || — || October 26, 2011 || Haleakala || Pan-STARRS ||  || align=right | 2.7 km || 
|-id=718 bgcolor=#d6d6d6
| 575718 ||  || — || April 8, 2014 || Haleakala || Pan-STARRS ||  || align=right | 2.8 km || 
|-id=719 bgcolor=#d6d6d6
| 575719 ||  || — || October 20, 2011 || Mount Lemmon || Mount Lemmon Survey ||  || align=right | 2.4 km || 
|-id=720 bgcolor=#fefefe
| 575720 ||  || — || June 26, 2014 || Haleakala || Pan-STARRS ||  || align=right data-sort-value="0.66" | 660 m || 
|-id=721 bgcolor=#d6d6d6
| 575721 ||  || — || February 13, 2013 || Haleakala || Pan-STARRS ||  || align=right | 2.3 km || 
|-id=722 bgcolor=#fefefe
| 575722 ||  || — || October 16, 2015 || Mount Lemmon || Mount Lemmon Survey ||  || align=right data-sort-value="0.82" | 820 m || 
|-id=723 bgcolor=#fefefe
| 575723 ||  || — || October 20, 2011 || Mount Lemmon || Mount Lemmon Survey ||  || align=right data-sort-value="0.54" | 540 m || 
|-id=724 bgcolor=#d6d6d6
| 575724 ||  || — || October 19, 2011 || Haleakala || Pan-STARRS ||  || align=right | 2.4 km || 
|-id=725 bgcolor=#fefefe
| 575725 ||  || — || October 23, 2011 || Haleakala || Pan-STARRS || H || align=right data-sort-value="0.52" | 520 m || 
|-id=726 bgcolor=#fefefe
| 575726 ||  || — || October 27, 2011 || Mount Lemmon || Mount Lemmon Survey ||  || align=right data-sort-value="0.78" | 780 m || 
|-id=727 bgcolor=#d6d6d6
| 575727 ||  || — || May 15, 2015 || Haleakala || Pan-STARRS ||  || align=right | 2.1 km || 
|-id=728 bgcolor=#d6d6d6
| 575728 ||  || — || October 23, 2011 || Haleakala || Pan-STARRS ||  || align=right | 2.4 km || 
|-id=729 bgcolor=#d6d6d6
| 575729 ||  || — || October 24, 2011 || Haleakala || Pan-STARRS ||  || align=right | 2.3 km || 
|-id=730 bgcolor=#E9E9E9
| 575730 ||  || — || January 12, 2008 || Mount Lemmon || Mount Lemmon Survey ||  || align=right data-sort-value="0.92" | 920 m || 
|-id=731 bgcolor=#d6d6d6
| 575731 ||  || — || June 4, 2014 || Haleakala || Pan-STARRS ||  || align=right | 2.6 km || 
|-id=732 bgcolor=#d6d6d6
| 575732 ||  || — || October 31, 2011 || Kitt Peak || Spacewatch ||  || align=right | 2.6 km || 
|-id=733 bgcolor=#fefefe
| 575733 ||  || — || October 26, 2011 || Haleakala || Pan-STARRS ||  || align=right data-sort-value="0.46" | 460 m || 
|-id=734 bgcolor=#d6d6d6
| 575734 ||  || — || October 24, 2011 || Haleakala || Pan-STARRS ||  || align=right | 2.6 km || 
|-id=735 bgcolor=#fefefe
| 575735 ||  || — || August 20, 2014 || Haleakala || Pan-STARRS ||  || align=right data-sort-value="0.71" | 710 m || 
|-id=736 bgcolor=#d6d6d6
| 575736 ||  || — || August 13, 2016 || Haleakala || Pan-STARRS ||  || align=right | 2.2 km || 
|-id=737 bgcolor=#d6d6d6
| 575737 ||  || — || May 28, 2014 || Mount Lemmon || Mount Lemmon Survey ||  || align=right | 3.0 km || 
|-id=738 bgcolor=#d6d6d6
| 575738 ||  || — || July 7, 2016 || Mount Lemmon || Mount Lemmon Survey ||  || align=right | 2.6 km || 
|-id=739 bgcolor=#d6d6d6
| 575739 ||  || — || October 19, 2011 || Haleakala || Pan-STARRS ||  || align=right | 2.4 km || 
|-id=740 bgcolor=#d6d6d6
| 575740 ||  || — || August 2, 2016 || Haleakala || Pan-STARRS ||  || align=right | 2.5 km || 
|-id=741 bgcolor=#d6d6d6
| 575741 ||  || — || October 25, 2011 || Haleakala || Pan-STARRS ||  || align=right | 3.7 km || 
|-id=742 bgcolor=#d6d6d6
| 575742 ||  || — || October 24, 2011 || Mount Lemmon || Mount Lemmon Survey ||  || align=right | 2.5 km || 
|-id=743 bgcolor=#d6d6d6
| 575743 ||  || — || October 21, 2011 || Kitt Peak || Spacewatch ||  || align=right | 2.0 km || 
|-id=744 bgcolor=#d6d6d6
| 575744 ||  || — || October 18, 2011 || Kitt Peak || Spacewatch ||  || align=right | 2.3 km || 
|-id=745 bgcolor=#d6d6d6
| 575745 ||  || — || October 22, 2011 || Mount Lemmon || Mount Lemmon Survey ||  || align=right | 2.2 km || 
|-id=746 bgcolor=#d6d6d6
| 575746 ||  || — || October 26, 2011 || Haleakala || Pan-STARRS ||  || align=right | 2.7 km || 
|-id=747 bgcolor=#d6d6d6
| 575747 ||  || — || October 26, 2011 || Haleakala || Pan-STARRS ||  || align=right | 2.4 km || 
|-id=748 bgcolor=#d6d6d6
| 575748 ||  || — || October 18, 2011 || Mount Lemmon || Mount Lemmon Survey ||  || align=right | 2.3 km || 
|-id=749 bgcolor=#d6d6d6
| 575749 ||  || — || October 23, 2011 || Mount Lemmon || Mount Lemmon Survey ||  || align=right | 2.4 km || 
|-id=750 bgcolor=#fefefe
| 575750 ||  || — || October 19, 2011 || Mount Lemmon || Mount Lemmon Survey ||  || align=right data-sort-value="0.56" | 560 m || 
|-id=751 bgcolor=#d6d6d6
| 575751 ||  || — || October 27, 2011 || Mount Lemmon || Mount Lemmon Survey || 7:4 || align=right | 3.0 km || 
|-id=752 bgcolor=#d6d6d6
| 575752 ||  || — || October 23, 2011 || Mount Lemmon || Mount Lemmon Survey ||  || align=right | 3.4 km || 
|-id=753 bgcolor=#d6d6d6
| 575753 ||  || — || October 30, 2011 || Mount Lemmon || Mount Lemmon Survey ||  || align=right | 1.9 km || 
|-id=754 bgcolor=#d6d6d6
| 575754 ||  || — || October 26, 2011 || Haleakala || Pan-STARRS ||  || align=right | 2.6 km || 
|-id=755 bgcolor=#d6d6d6
| 575755 ||  || — || October 22, 2011 || Mount Lemmon || Mount Lemmon Survey ||  || align=right | 2.8 km || 
|-id=756 bgcolor=#d6d6d6
| 575756 ||  || — || October 24, 2011 || Haleakala || Pan-STARRS ||  || align=right | 2.2 km || 
|-id=757 bgcolor=#d6d6d6
| 575757 ||  || — || October 23, 2011 || Haleakala || Pan-STARRS ||  || align=right | 2.2 km || 
|-id=758 bgcolor=#fefefe
| 575758 ||  || — || October 26, 2011 || Haleakala || Pan-STARRS ||  || align=right data-sort-value="0.64" | 640 m || 
|-id=759 bgcolor=#d6d6d6
| 575759 ||  || — || October 23, 2011 || Haleakala || Pan-STARRS ||  || align=right | 2.5 km || 
|-id=760 bgcolor=#d6d6d6
| 575760 ||  || — || October 23, 2011 || Haleakala || Pan-STARRS ||  || align=right | 2.9 km || 
|-id=761 bgcolor=#d6d6d6
| 575761 ||  || — || October 25, 2011 || Haleakala || Pan-STARRS ||  || align=right | 2.1 km || 
|-id=762 bgcolor=#d6d6d6
| 575762 ||  || — || October 24, 2011 || Haleakala || Pan-STARRS ||  || align=right | 2.3 km || 
|-id=763 bgcolor=#d6d6d6
| 575763 ||  || — || October 24, 2011 || Haleakala || Pan-STARRS ||  || align=right | 2.1 km || 
|-id=764 bgcolor=#fefefe
| 575764 ||  || — || September 19, 2007 || Kitt Peak || Spacewatch ||  || align=right data-sort-value="0.60" | 600 m || 
|-id=765 bgcolor=#d6d6d6
| 575765 ||  || — || October 24, 2011 || Haleakala || Pan-STARRS ||  || align=right | 2.5 km || 
|-id=766 bgcolor=#d6d6d6
| 575766 ||  || — || October 23, 2011 || Haleakala || Pan-STARRS ||  || align=right | 2.0 km || 
|-id=767 bgcolor=#E9E9E9
| 575767 ||  || — || October 20, 2011 || Mount Lemmon || Mount Lemmon Survey ||  || align=right | 1.6 km || 
|-id=768 bgcolor=#d6d6d6
| 575768 ||  || — || October 26, 2011 || Haleakala || Pan-STARRS ||  || align=right | 1.8 km || 
|-id=769 bgcolor=#fefefe
| 575769 ||  || — || September 10, 2007 || Mount Lemmon || Mount Lemmon Survey ||  || align=right data-sort-value="0.43" | 430 m || 
|-id=770 bgcolor=#d6d6d6
| 575770 ||  || — || October 23, 2011 || Mount Lemmon || Mount Lemmon Survey ||  || align=right | 2.4 km || 
|-id=771 bgcolor=#d6d6d6
| 575771 ||  || — || October 20, 2011 || Mount Lemmon || Mount Lemmon Survey ||  || align=right | 2.8 km || 
|-id=772 bgcolor=#d6d6d6
| 575772 ||  || — || October 24, 2011 || Haleakala || Pan-STARRS ||  || align=right | 2.6 km || 
|-id=773 bgcolor=#fefefe
| 575773 ||  || — || October 19, 2011 || Kitt Peak || Spacewatch ||  || align=right data-sort-value="0.82" | 820 m || 
|-id=774 bgcolor=#fefefe
| 575774 ||  || — || October 23, 2011 || Mount Lemmon || Mount Lemmon Survey ||  || align=right data-sort-value="0.59" | 590 m || 
|-id=775 bgcolor=#fefefe
| 575775 ||  || — || November 3, 2004 || Kitt Peak || Spacewatch ||  || align=right data-sort-value="0.50" | 500 m || 
|-id=776 bgcolor=#d6d6d6
| 575776 ||  || — || December 17, 2007 || Mount Lemmon || Mount Lemmon Survey ||  || align=right | 2.3 km || 
|-id=777 bgcolor=#d6d6d6
| 575777 ||  || — || December 17, 2001 || Kitt Peak || Spacewatch ||  || align=right | 3.9 km || 
|-id=778 bgcolor=#d6d6d6
| 575778 ||  || — || September 30, 2011 || Kitt Peak || Spacewatch ||  || align=right | 2.5 km || 
|-id=779 bgcolor=#fefefe
| 575779 ||  || — || November 3, 2011 || Mount Lemmon || Mount Lemmon Survey ||  || align=right data-sort-value="0.91" | 910 m || 
|-id=780 bgcolor=#d6d6d6
| 575780 ||  || — || October 19, 2011 || Kitt Peak || Spacewatch ||  || align=right | 1.8 km || 
|-id=781 bgcolor=#d6d6d6
| 575781 ||  || — || August 30, 2005 || Kitt Peak || Spacewatch ||  || align=right | 2.2 km || 
|-id=782 bgcolor=#d6d6d6
| 575782 ||  || — || November 27, 2006 || Mount Lemmon || Mount Lemmon Survey ||  || align=right | 1.9 km || 
|-id=783 bgcolor=#E9E9E9
| 575783 ||  || — || October 24, 2011 || Haleakala || Pan-STARRS ||  || align=right | 1.2 km || 
|-id=784 bgcolor=#d6d6d6
| 575784 ||  || — || October 22, 2011 || Kitt Peak || Spacewatch ||  || align=right | 2.2 km || 
|-id=785 bgcolor=#d6d6d6
| 575785 ||  || — || November 3, 2011 || Mount Lemmon || Mount Lemmon Survey ||  || align=right | 2.6 km || 
|-id=786 bgcolor=#d6d6d6
| 575786 ||  || — || July 4, 2005 || Kitt Peak || Spacewatch ||  || align=right | 3.2 km || 
|-id=787 bgcolor=#d6d6d6
| 575787 ||  || — || November 3, 2011 || Mount Lemmon || Mount Lemmon Survey ||  || align=right | 2.7 km || 
|-id=788 bgcolor=#fefefe
| 575788 ||  || — || November 1, 2011 || Catalina || CSS || H || align=right data-sort-value="0.76" | 760 m || 
|-id=789 bgcolor=#d6d6d6
| 575789 ||  || — || December 23, 2012 || Haleakala || Pan-STARRS ||  || align=right | 2.1 km || 
|-id=790 bgcolor=#d6d6d6
| 575790 ||  || — || January 17, 2013 || Kitt Peak || Spacewatch ||  || align=right | 2.0 km || 
|-id=791 bgcolor=#d6d6d6
| 575791 ||  || — || November 2, 2011 || Mount Lemmon || Mount Lemmon Survey ||  || align=right | 2.4 km || 
|-id=792 bgcolor=#d6d6d6
| 575792 ||  || — || January 17, 2013 || Haleakala || Pan-STARRS ||  || align=right | 1.9 km || 
|-id=793 bgcolor=#d6d6d6
| 575793 ||  || — || January 17, 2013 || Haleakala || Pan-STARRS ||  || align=right | 2.2 km || 
|-id=794 bgcolor=#d6d6d6
| 575794 ||  || — || November 3, 2011 || Mount Lemmon || Mount Lemmon Survey ||  || align=right | 2.7 km || 
|-id=795 bgcolor=#d6d6d6
| 575795 ||  || — || November 3, 2011 || Mount Lemmon || Mount Lemmon Survey ||  || align=right | 2.7 km || 
|-id=796 bgcolor=#d6d6d6
| 575796 ||  || — || November 2, 2011 || Mount Lemmon || Mount Lemmon Survey ||  || align=right | 1.9 km || 
|-id=797 bgcolor=#d6d6d6
| 575797 ||  || — || November 2, 2011 || Mount Lemmon || Mount Lemmon Survey ||  || align=right | 3.0 km || 
|-id=798 bgcolor=#d6d6d6
| 575798 ||  || — || November 16, 2011 || Mount Lemmon || Mount Lemmon Survey ||  || align=right | 2.4 km || 
|-id=799 bgcolor=#d6d6d6
| 575799 ||  || — || October 24, 2011 || Haleakala || Pan-STARRS ||  || align=right | 2.2 km || 
|-id=800 bgcolor=#fefefe
| 575800 ||  || — || November 3, 2011 || Mount Lemmon || Mount Lemmon Survey || H || align=right data-sort-value="0.68" | 680 m || 
|}

575801–575900 

|-bgcolor=#fefefe
| 575801 ||  || — || October 6, 2004 || Palomar || NEAT ||  || align=right data-sort-value="0.71" | 710 m || 
|-id=802 bgcolor=#E9E9E9
| 575802 ||  || — || November 3, 2007 || Kitt Peak || Spacewatch || critical || align=right data-sort-value="0.54" | 540 m || 
|-id=803 bgcolor=#d6d6d6
| 575803 ||  || — || August 6, 2005 || Palomar || NEAT ||  || align=right | 2.8 km || 
|-id=804 bgcolor=#fefefe
| 575804 ||  || — || September 21, 2000 || Haleakala || AMOS ||  || align=right data-sort-value="0.82" | 820 m || 
|-id=805 bgcolor=#d6d6d6
| 575805 ||  || — || October 24, 2011 || Kitt Peak || Spacewatch ||  || align=right | 2.7 km || 
|-id=806 bgcolor=#d6d6d6
| 575806 ||  || — || October 18, 2011 || Mount Lemmon || Mount Lemmon Survey ||  || align=right | 2.4 km || 
|-id=807 bgcolor=#d6d6d6
| 575807 ||  || — || November 1, 2011 || Kitt Peak || Spacewatch ||  || align=right | 2.2 km || 
|-id=808 bgcolor=#d6d6d6
| 575808 ||  || — || November 17, 2011 || Mount Lemmon || Mount Lemmon Survey ||  || align=right | 2.8 km || 
|-id=809 bgcolor=#fefefe
| 575809 ||  || — || October 23, 2011 || Haleakala || Pan-STARRS || H || align=right data-sort-value="0.75" | 750 m || 
|-id=810 bgcolor=#fefefe
| 575810 ||  || — || September 8, 2000 || Kitt Peak || Spacewatch ||  || align=right data-sort-value="0.75" | 750 m || 
|-id=811 bgcolor=#d6d6d6
| 575811 ||  || — || October 25, 2011 || Kitt Peak || Spacewatch ||  || align=right | 2.9 km || 
|-id=812 bgcolor=#d6d6d6
| 575812 ||  || — || October 24, 2011 || Haleakala || Pan-STARRS ||  || align=right | 2.0 km || 
|-id=813 bgcolor=#d6d6d6
| 575813 ||  || — || November 22, 2011 || Piszkesteto || A. Pál ||  || align=right | 2.5 km || 
|-id=814 bgcolor=#d6d6d6
| 575814 ||  || — || November 23, 2011 || Piszkesteto || A. Pál ||  || align=right | 2.5 km || 
|-id=815 bgcolor=#fefefe
| 575815 ||  || — || August 10, 2007 || Eskridge || G. Hug ||  || align=right data-sort-value="0.77" | 770 m || 
|-id=816 bgcolor=#d6d6d6
| 575816 ||  || — || October 28, 2011 || Mount Lemmon || Mount Lemmon Survey ||  || align=right | 2.8 km || 
|-id=817 bgcolor=#d6d6d6
| 575817 ||  || — || October 23, 2005 || Catalina || CSS ||  || align=right | 3.9 km || 
|-id=818 bgcolor=#d6d6d6
| 575818 ||  || — || August 28, 2005 || Anderson Mesa || LONEOS ||  || align=right | 2.7 km || 
|-id=819 bgcolor=#fefefe
| 575819 ||  || — || November 24, 2011 || Haleakala || Pan-STARRS || H || align=right data-sort-value="0.48" | 480 m || 
|-id=820 bgcolor=#fefefe
| 575820 ||  || — || October 4, 2007 || Mount Lemmon || Mount Lemmon Survey ||  || align=right data-sort-value="0.71" | 710 m || 
|-id=821 bgcolor=#fefefe
| 575821 ||  || — || December 15, 2001 || Apache Point || SDSS Collaboration ||  || align=right data-sort-value="0.59" | 590 m || 
|-id=822 bgcolor=#fefefe
| 575822 ||  || — || November 16, 2011 || Mount Lemmon || Mount Lemmon Survey ||  || align=right data-sort-value="0.58" | 580 m || 
|-id=823 bgcolor=#fefefe
| 575823 ||  || — || November 25, 2011 || Haleakala || Pan-STARRS || H || align=right data-sort-value="0.54" | 540 m || 
|-id=824 bgcolor=#fefefe
| 575824 ||  || — || May 16, 2005 || Kitt Peak || Spacewatch || H || align=right data-sort-value="0.54" | 540 m || 
|-id=825 bgcolor=#fefefe
| 575825 ||  || — || April 15, 2010 || Mount Lemmon || Mount Lemmon Survey ||  || align=right data-sort-value="0.65" | 650 m || 
|-id=826 bgcolor=#fefefe
| 575826 ||  || — || November 3, 2011 || Mount Lemmon || Mount Lemmon Survey || H || align=right data-sort-value="0.52" | 520 m || 
|-id=827 bgcolor=#fefefe
| 575827 ||  || — || November 23, 2011 || Catalina || CSS ||  || align=right data-sort-value="0.67" | 670 m || 
|-id=828 bgcolor=#d6d6d6
| 575828 ||  || — || November 12, 2006 || Mount Lemmon || Mount Lemmon Survey || EOS || align=right | 1.6 km || 
|-id=829 bgcolor=#FA8072
| 575829 ||  || — || August 8, 2004 || Palomar || NEAT ||  || align=right data-sort-value="0.68" | 680 m || 
|-id=830 bgcolor=#d6d6d6
| 575830 ||  || — || August 27, 2005 || Palomar || NEAT ||  || align=right | 2.1 km || 
|-id=831 bgcolor=#d6d6d6
| 575831 ||  || — || October 23, 2011 || Kitt Peak || Spacewatch ||  || align=right | 2.5 km || 
|-id=832 bgcolor=#d6d6d6
| 575832 ||  || — || October 26, 2011 || Haleakala || Pan-STARRS ||  || align=right | 2.4 km || 
|-id=833 bgcolor=#d6d6d6
| 575833 ||  || — || October 26, 2011 || Haleakala || Pan-STARRS ||  || align=right | 1.7 km || 
|-id=834 bgcolor=#d6d6d6
| 575834 ||  || — || October 26, 2011 || Haleakala || Pan-STARRS ||  || align=right | 2.3 km || 
|-id=835 bgcolor=#d6d6d6
| 575835 ||  || — || October 26, 2011 || Haleakala || Pan-STARRS ||  || align=right | 2.2 km || 
|-id=836 bgcolor=#FA8072
| 575836 ||  || — || February 6, 2002 || Kitt Peak || R. Millis, M. W. Buie ||  || align=right data-sort-value="0.73" | 730 m || 
|-id=837 bgcolor=#fefefe
| 575837 ||  || — || October 26, 2011 || Haleakala || Pan-STARRS ||  || align=right data-sort-value="0.54" | 540 m || 
|-id=838 bgcolor=#d6d6d6
| 575838 ||  || — || October 26, 2011 || Haleakala || Pan-STARRS ||  || align=right | 2.3 km || 
|-id=839 bgcolor=#d6d6d6
| 575839 ||  || — || October 26, 2011 || Haleakala || Pan-STARRS ||  || align=right | 2.6 km || 
|-id=840 bgcolor=#d6d6d6
| 575840 ||  || — || October 20, 2011 || Mount Lemmon || Mount Lemmon Survey ||  || align=right | 2.1 km || 
|-id=841 bgcolor=#d6d6d6
| 575841 ||  || — || September 1, 2005 || Palomar || NEAT ||  || align=right | 3.1 km || 
|-id=842 bgcolor=#d6d6d6
| 575842 ||  || — || October 23, 2011 || Kitt Peak || Spacewatch ||  || align=right | 2.8 km || 
|-id=843 bgcolor=#d6d6d6
| 575843 ||  || — || October 25, 2011 || Haleakala || Pan-STARRS ||  || align=right | 2.5 km || 
|-id=844 bgcolor=#d6d6d6
| 575844 ||  || — || January 17, 2007 || Kitt Peak || Spacewatch ||  || align=right | 2.7 km || 
|-id=845 bgcolor=#fefefe
| 575845 ||  || — || September 12, 2007 || Mount Lemmon || Mount Lemmon Survey ||  || align=right data-sort-value="0.60" | 600 m || 
|-id=846 bgcolor=#d6d6d6
| 575846 ||  || — || October 29, 2011 || Kitt Peak || Spacewatch ||  || align=right | 2.2 km || 
|-id=847 bgcolor=#d6d6d6
| 575847 ||  || — || September 30, 2005 || Mount Lemmon || Mount Lemmon Survey ||  || align=right | 1.8 km || 
|-id=848 bgcolor=#d6d6d6
| 575848 ||  || — || November 25, 2011 || Haleakala || Pan-STARRS ||  || align=right | 3.0 km || 
|-id=849 bgcolor=#d6d6d6
| 575849 ||  || — || November 17, 2011 || Kitt Peak || Spacewatch ||  || align=right | 3.2 km || 
|-id=850 bgcolor=#fefefe
| 575850 ||  || — || January 14, 2002 || Kitt Peak || Spacewatch ||  || align=right data-sort-value="0.63" | 630 m || 
|-id=851 bgcolor=#d6d6d6
| 575851 ||  || — || October 19, 2011 || Kitt Peak || Spacewatch ||  || align=right | 2.7 km || 
|-id=852 bgcolor=#d6d6d6
| 575852 ||  || — || October 26, 2011 || Haleakala || Pan-STARRS ||  || align=right | 1.9 km || 
|-id=853 bgcolor=#d6d6d6
| 575853 ||  || — || November 27, 2011 || Mount Lemmon || Mount Lemmon Survey ||  || align=right | 2.7 km || 
|-id=854 bgcolor=#fefefe
| 575854 ||  || — || October 30, 2011 || Mount Lemmon || Mount Lemmon Survey ||  || align=right data-sort-value="0.65" | 650 m || 
|-id=855 bgcolor=#d6d6d6
| 575855 ||  || — || October 25, 2011 || Haleakala || Pan-STARRS ||  || align=right | 2.4 km || 
|-id=856 bgcolor=#E9E9E9
| 575856 ||  || — || October 23, 2011 || Haleakala || Pan-STARRS ||  || align=right | 1.5 km || 
|-id=857 bgcolor=#d6d6d6
| 575857 ||  || — || November 27, 2011 || Kitt Peak || Spacewatch ||  || align=right | 2.3 km || 
|-id=858 bgcolor=#d6d6d6
| 575858 ||  || — || October 26, 2011 || Haleakala || Pan-STARRS ||  || align=right | 2.3 km || 
|-id=859 bgcolor=#fefefe
| 575859 ||  || — || October 23, 2011 || Haleakala || Pan-STARRS ||  || align=right data-sort-value="0.65" | 650 m || 
|-id=860 bgcolor=#d6d6d6
| 575860 ||  || — || February 13, 2002 || Apache Point || SDSS Collaboration ||  || align=right | 2.3 km || 
|-id=861 bgcolor=#d6d6d6
| 575861 ||  || — || October 24, 2011 || Haleakala || Pan-STARRS ||  || align=right | 2.1 km || 
|-id=862 bgcolor=#d6d6d6
| 575862 ||  || — || October 28, 2006 || Mount Lemmon || Mount Lemmon Survey ||  || align=right | 4.2 km || 
|-id=863 bgcolor=#d6d6d6
| 575863 ||  || — || November 30, 2011 || Kitt Peak || Spacewatch ||  || align=right | 2.5 km || 
|-id=864 bgcolor=#d6d6d6
| 575864 ||  || — || September 24, 2011 || Mount Lemmon || Mount Lemmon Survey ||  || align=right | 2.7 km || 
|-id=865 bgcolor=#d6d6d6
| 575865 ||  || — || July 27, 2005 || Palomar || NEAT ||  || align=right | 2.2 km || 
|-id=866 bgcolor=#fefefe
| 575866 ||  || — || November 17, 2011 || Mount Lemmon || Mount Lemmon Survey ||  || align=right data-sort-value="0.62" | 620 m || 
|-id=867 bgcolor=#fefefe
| 575867 ||  || — || July 23, 2003 || Palomar || NEAT ||  || align=right | 1.3 km || 
|-id=868 bgcolor=#d6d6d6
| 575868 ||  || — || November 18, 2011 || Mount Lemmon || Mount Lemmon Survey ||  || align=right | 3.2 km || 
|-id=869 bgcolor=#d6d6d6
| 575869 ||  || — || October 13, 1999 || Apache Point || SDSS Collaboration ||  || align=right | 2.7 km || 
|-id=870 bgcolor=#d6d6d6
| 575870 ||  || — || November 18, 2011 || Mount Lemmon || Mount Lemmon Survey ||  || align=right | 2.6 km || 
|-id=871 bgcolor=#d6d6d6
| 575871 ||  || — || October 29, 2011 || Kitt Peak || Spacewatch ||  || align=right | 2.6 km || 
|-id=872 bgcolor=#d6d6d6
| 575872 ||  || — || October 10, 1999 || Kitt Peak || Spacewatch ||  || align=right | 3.0 km || 
|-id=873 bgcolor=#d6d6d6
| 575873 ||  || — || October 26, 2011 || Haleakala || Pan-STARRS ||  || align=right | 2.1 km || 
|-id=874 bgcolor=#d6d6d6
| 575874 ||  || — || October 26, 2011 || Haleakala || Pan-STARRS ||  || align=right | 2.5 km || 
|-id=875 bgcolor=#fefefe
| 575875 ||  || — || July 7, 2000 || Kitt Peak || Spacewatch || V || align=right data-sort-value="0.54" | 540 m || 
|-id=876 bgcolor=#d6d6d6
| 575876 ||  || — || September 1, 2005 || Palomar || NEAT || LIX || align=right | 3.0 km || 
|-id=877 bgcolor=#d6d6d6
| 575877 ||  || — || August 29, 2005 || Kitt Peak || Spacewatch ||  || align=right | 2.4 km || 
|-id=878 bgcolor=#d6d6d6
| 575878 ||  || — || October 27, 2011 || Mount Lemmon || Mount Lemmon Survey ||  || align=right | 2.8 km || 
|-id=879 bgcolor=#d6d6d6
| 575879 ||  || — || October 23, 2011 || Haleakala || Pan-STARRS ||  || align=right | 2.7 km || 
|-id=880 bgcolor=#d6d6d6
| 575880 ||  || — || November 19, 2011 || Mount Lemmon || Mount Lemmon Survey ||  || align=right | 2.6 km || 
|-id=881 bgcolor=#d6d6d6
| 575881 ||  || — || July 12, 2005 || Mount Lemmon || Mount Lemmon Survey ||  || align=right | 2.0 km || 
|-id=882 bgcolor=#fefefe
| 575882 ||  || — || May 21, 2010 || Mount Lemmon || Mount Lemmon Survey ||  || align=right data-sort-value="0.93" | 930 m || 
|-id=883 bgcolor=#fefefe
| 575883 ||  || — || October 25, 2011 || Haleakala || Pan-STARRS ||  || align=right data-sort-value="0.74" | 740 m || 
|-id=884 bgcolor=#d6d6d6
| 575884 ||  || — || November 18, 2011 || Mount Lemmon || Mount Lemmon Survey ||  || align=right | 2.6 km || 
|-id=885 bgcolor=#C2FFFF
| 575885 ||  || — || November 25, 2011 || Haleakala || Pan-STARRS || L4 || align=right | 9.6 km || 
|-id=886 bgcolor=#d6d6d6
| 575886 ||  || — || February 7, 2013 || Catalina || CSS ||  || align=right | 3.5 km || 
|-id=887 bgcolor=#fefefe
| 575887 ||  || — || June 4, 2014 || Haleakala || Pan-STARRS ||  || align=right data-sort-value="0.59" | 590 m || 
|-id=888 bgcolor=#d6d6d6
| 575888 ||  || — || May 28, 2014 || Mount Lemmon || Mount Lemmon Survey ||  || align=right | 2.9 km || 
|-id=889 bgcolor=#d6d6d6
| 575889 ||  || — || November 27, 2011 || Mount Lemmon || Mount Lemmon Survey ||  || align=right | 2.8 km || 
|-id=890 bgcolor=#d6d6d6
| 575890 ||  || — || November 30, 2011 || Catalina || CSS ||  || align=right | 2.9 km || 
|-id=891 bgcolor=#fefefe
| 575891 ||  || — || March 3, 2013 || Nogales || M. Schwartz, P. R. Holvorcem ||  || align=right data-sort-value="0.69" | 690 m || 
|-id=892 bgcolor=#d6d6d6
| 575892 ||  || — || December 30, 2000 || Socorro || LINEAR ||  || align=right | 2.5 km || 
|-id=893 bgcolor=#fefefe
| 575893 ||  || — || June 26, 2014 || Haleakala || Pan-STARRS ||  || align=right data-sort-value="0.66" | 660 m || 
|-id=894 bgcolor=#d6d6d6
| 575894 ||  || — || January 17, 2013 || Kitt Peak || Spacewatch ||  || align=right | 2.9 km || 
|-id=895 bgcolor=#d6d6d6
| 575895 ||  || — || November 27, 2011 || Mount Lemmon || Mount Lemmon Survey ||  || align=right | 2.6 km || 
|-id=896 bgcolor=#d6d6d6
| 575896 ||  || — || November 18, 2011 || Mount Lemmon || Mount Lemmon Survey ||  || align=right | 2.8 km || 
|-id=897 bgcolor=#d6d6d6
| 575897 ||  || — || November 25, 2011 || Haleakala || Pan-STARRS ||  || align=right | 2.6 km || 
|-id=898 bgcolor=#d6d6d6
| 575898 ||  || — || November 24, 2011 || Haleakala || Pan-STARRS ||  || align=right | 2.6 km || 
|-id=899 bgcolor=#d6d6d6
| 575899 ||  || — || November 24, 2011 || Mount Lemmon || Mount Lemmon Survey ||  || align=right | 3.1 km || 
|-id=900 bgcolor=#d6d6d6
| 575900 ||  || — || November 24, 2011 || Haleakala || Pan-STARRS ||  || align=right | 3.2 km || 
|}

575901–576000 

|-bgcolor=#fefefe
| 575901 ||  || — || November 28, 2011 || Mount Lemmon || Mount Lemmon Survey ||  || align=right data-sort-value="0.70" | 700 m || 
|-id=902 bgcolor=#d6d6d6
| 575902 ||  || — || December 6, 2011 || Haleakala || Pan-STARRS ||  || align=right | 2.7 km || 
|-id=903 bgcolor=#C2FFFF
| 575903 ||  || — || September 18, 2009 || Kitt Peak || Spacewatch || L4 || align=right | 9.6 km || 
|-id=904 bgcolor=#d6d6d6
| 575904 ||  || — || May 1, 2009 || Mount Lemmon || Mount Lemmon Survey ||  || align=right | 3.4 km || 
|-id=905 bgcolor=#fefefe
| 575905 ||  || — || December 24, 2011 || Catalina || CSS || H || align=right data-sort-value="0.71" | 710 m || 
|-id=906 bgcolor=#d6d6d6
| 575906 ||  || — || November 18, 2011 || Mount Lemmon || Mount Lemmon Survey ||  || align=right | 3.5 km || 
|-id=907 bgcolor=#d6d6d6
| 575907 ||  || — || December 3, 2005 || Kitt Peak || Spacewatch ||  || align=right | 2.6 km || 
|-id=908 bgcolor=#fefefe
| 575908 ||  || — || February 3, 2001 || Kitt Peak || Spacewatch ||  || align=right data-sort-value="0.87" | 870 m || 
|-id=909 bgcolor=#fefefe
| 575909 ||  || — || December 26, 2011 || Mount Lemmon || Mount Lemmon Survey ||  || align=right data-sort-value="0.76" | 760 m || 
|-id=910 bgcolor=#d6d6d6
| 575910 ||  || — || December 28, 2011 || Mount Lemmon || Mount Lemmon Survey ||  || align=right | 2.6 km || 
|-id=911 bgcolor=#d6d6d6
| 575911 ||  || — || February 19, 2001 || Haleakala || AMOS ||  || align=right | 3.5 km || 
|-id=912 bgcolor=#d6d6d6
| 575912 ||  || — || December 25, 2011 || Kitt Peak || Spacewatch ||  || align=right | 2.8 km || 
|-id=913 bgcolor=#C2FFFF
| 575913 ||  || — || November 24, 2011 || Haleakala || Pan-STARRS || L4006 || align=right | 9.9 km || 
|-id=914 bgcolor=#fefefe
| 575914 ||  || — || November 16, 2011 || Kitt Peak || Spacewatch ||  || align=right data-sort-value="0.94" | 940 m || 
|-id=915 bgcolor=#fefefe
| 575915 ||  || — || December 13, 2003 || Palomar || NEAT || H || align=right data-sort-value="0.73" | 730 m || 
|-id=916 bgcolor=#d6d6d6
| 575916 ||  || — || December 23, 2000 || Apache Point || SDSS Collaboration ||  || align=right | 3.0 km || 
|-id=917 bgcolor=#d6d6d6
| 575917 ||  || — || November 1, 2005 || Catalina || CSS ||  || align=right | 2.8 km || 
|-id=918 bgcolor=#fefefe
| 575918 ||  || — || November 2, 2007 || Mount Lemmon || Mount Lemmon Survey ||  || align=right data-sort-value="0.69" | 690 m || 
|-id=919 bgcolor=#fefefe
| 575919 ||  || — || December 26, 2011 || Kitt Peak || Spacewatch ||  || align=right data-sort-value="0.81" | 810 m || 
|-id=920 bgcolor=#fefefe
| 575920 ||  || — || December 26, 2011 || Kitt Peak || Spacewatch ||  || align=right data-sort-value="0.81" | 810 m || 
|-id=921 bgcolor=#fefefe
| 575921 ||  || — || December 26, 2011 || Kitt Peak || Spacewatch ||  || align=right data-sort-value="0.59" | 590 m || 
|-id=922 bgcolor=#d6d6d6
| 575922 ||  || — || October 17, 2010 || Mount Lemmon || Mount Lemmon Survey ||  || align=right | 2.4 km || 
|-id=923 bgcolor=#fefefe
| 575923 ||  || — || December 26, 2011 || Kitt Peak || Spacewatch || H || align=right data-sort-value="0.57" | 570 m || 
|-id=924 bgcolor=#fefefe
| 575924 ||  || — || November 27, 2011 || Mount Lemmon || Mount Lemmon Survey ||  || align=right data-sort-value="0.68" | 680 m || 
|-id=925 bgcolor=#fefefe
| 575925 ||  || — || November 20, 2008 || Mount Lemmon || Mount Lemmon Survey ||  || align=right data-sort-value="0.63" | 630 m || 
|-id=926 bgcolor=#d6d6d6
| 575926 ||  || — || December 25, 2011 || Mount Lemmon || Mount Lemmon Survey ||  || align=right | 3.5 km || 
|-id=927 bgcolor=#fefefe
| 575927 ||  || — || December 27, 2011 || Kitt Peak || Spacewatch ||  || align=right data-sort-value="0.79" | 790 m || 
|-id=928 bgcolor=#fefefe
| 575928 ||  || — || December 27, 2011 || Kitt Peak || Spacewatch ||  || align=right data-sort-value="0.80" | 800 m || 
|-id=929 bgcolor=#d6d6d6
| 575929 ||  || — || October 14, 2010 || Mount Lemmon || Mount Lemmon Survey ||  || align=right | 3.3 km || 
|-id=930 bgcolor=#d6d6d6
| 575930 ||  || — || December 29, 2011 || Ka-Dar || V. Gerke ||  || align=right | 3.0 km || 
|-id=931 bgcolor=#fefefe
| 575931 ||  || — || December 27, 2011 || Kitt Peak || Spacewatch ||  || align=right data-sort-value="0.56" | 560 m || 
|-id=932 bgcolor=#fefefe
| 575932 ||  || — || December 14, 2007 || Dauban || C. Rinner, F. Kugel ||  || align=right data-sort-value="0.82" | 820 m || 
|-id=933 bgcolor=#fefefe
| 575933 ||  || — || October 12, 2007 || Catalina || CSS ||  || align=right data-sort-value="0.66" | 660 m || 
|-id=934 bgcolor=#d6d6d6
| 575934 ||  || — || April 30, 2008 || Kitt Peak || Spacewatch ||  || align=right | 2.6 km || 
|-id=935 bgcolor=#d6d6d6
| 575935 ||  || — || December 15, 2006 || Kitt Peak || Spacewatch ||  || align=right | 3.2 km || 
|-id=936 bgcolor=#fefefe
| 575936 ||  || — || December 27, 2011 || Catalina || CSS || H || align=right data-sort-value="0.69" | 690 m || 
|-id=937 bgcolor=#d6d6d6
| 575937 ||  || — || July 14, 2009 || Kitt Peak || Spacewatch ||  || align=right | 3.0 km || 
|-id=938 bgcolor=#fefefe
| 575938 ||  || — || March 24, 2001 || Kitt Peak || Spacewatch ||  || align=right data-sort-value="0.80" | 800 m || 
|-id=939 bgcolor=#E9E9E9
| 575939 ||  || — || December 30, 2011 || Observatorio Cala || B. Linero, I. d. l. Cueva ||  || align=right | 1.6 km || 
|-id=940 bgcolor=#fefefe
| 575940 ||  || — || September 19, 2003 || Palomar || NEAT ||  || align=right | 1.1 km || 
|-id=941 bgcolor=#d6d6d6
| 575941 ||  || — || November 29, 2011 || Kitt Peak || Spacewatch ||  || align=right | 2.9 km || 
|-id=942 bgcolor=#E9E9E9
| 575942 ||  || — || December 29, 2011 || Mount Lemmon || Mount Lemmon Survey ||  || align=right data-sort-value="0.94" | 940 m || 
|-id=943 bgcolor=#fefefe
| 575943 ||  || — || November 5, 2007 || Kitt Peak || Spacewatch ||  || align=right data-sort-value="0.55" | 550 m || 
|-id=944 bgcolor=#d6d6d6
| 575944 ||  || — || November 30, 2011 || Catalina || CSS ||  || align=right | 3.0 km || 
|-id=945 bgcolor=#d6d6d6
| 575945 ||  || — || July 24, 2015 || Haleakala || Pan-STARRS ||  || align=right | 2.5 km || 
|-id=946 bgcolor=#d6d6d6
| 575946 ||  || — || December 30, 2011 || Kitt Peak || Spacewatch ||  || align=right | 2.7 km || 
|-id=947 bgcolor=#d6d6d6
| 575947 ||  || — || April 5, 2014 || Haleakala || Pan-STARRS ||  || align=right | 2.9 km || 
|-id=948 bgcolor=#d6d6d6
| 575948 ||  || — || February 13, 2013 || Haleakala || Pan-STARRS ||  || align=right | 2.7 km || 
|-id=949 bgcolor=#d6d6d6
| 575949 ||  || — || December 29, 2011 || Mount Lemmon || Mount Lemmon Survey || Tj (2.97) || align=right | 2.2 km || 
|-id=950 bgcolor=#d6d6d6
| 575950 ||  || — || February 17, 2018 || Mount Lemmon || Mount Lemmon Survey ||  || align=right | 2.3 km || 
|-id=951 bgcolor=#fefefe
| 575951 ||  || — || December 27, 2011 || Kitt Peak || Spacewatch ||  || align=right data-sort-value="0.70" | 700 m || 
|-id=952 bgcolor=#d6d6d6
| 575952 ||  || — || October 26, 2016 || Mount Lemmon || Mount Lemmon Survey ||  || align=right | 2.7 km || 
|-id=953 bgcolor=#d6d6d6
| 575953 ||  || — || July 24, 2015 || Haleakala || Pan-STARRS ||  || align=right | 2.5 km || 
|-id=954 bgcolor=#E9E9E9
| 575954 ||  || — || December 31, 2011 || Kitt Peak || Spacewatch ||  || align=right data-sort-value="0.73" | 730 m || 
|-id=955 bgcolor=#d6d6d6
| 575955 ||  || — || December 25, 2011 || Kitt Peak || Spacewatch ||  || align=right | 2.4 km || 
|-id=956 bgcolor=#d6d6d6
| 575956 ||  || — || January 1, 2012 || Mount Lemmon || Mount Lemmon Survey ||  || align=right | 2.2 km || 
|-id=957 bgcolor=#fefefe
| 575957 ||  || — || September 26, 2003 || Apache Point || SDSS Collaboration || CLA || align=right | 1.6 km || 
|-id=958 bgcolor=#E9E9E9
| 575958 ||  || — || January 5, 2012 || Haleakala || Pan-STARRS ||  || align=right data-sort-value="0.90" | 900 m || 
|-id=959 bgcolor=#d6d6d6
| 575959 ||  || — || December 30, 2011 || Mount Lemmon || Mount Lemmon Survey ||  || align=right | 2.4 km || 
|-id=960 bgcolor=#d6d6d6
| 575960 ||  || — || February 17, 2007 || Catalina || CSS ||  || align=right | 3.7 km || 
|-id=961 bgcolor=#fefefe
| 575961 ||  || — || November 11, 1999 || Kitt Peak || Spacewatch || MAS || align=right data-sort-value="0.77" | 770 m || 
|-id=962 bgcolor=#d6d6d6
| 575962 ||  || — || August 20, 2010 || Siding Spring || SSS || Tj (2.99) || align=right | 4.0 km || 
|-id=963 bgcolor=#d6d6d6
| 575963 ||  || — || December 26, 2011 || Les Engarouines || L. Bernasconi ||  || align=right | 3.2 km || 
|-id=964 bgcolor=#d6d6d6
| 575964 ||  || — || December 7, 2005 || Kitt Peak || Spacewatch ||  || align=right | 2.8 km || 
|-id=965 bgcolor=#d6d6d6
| 575965 ||  || — || August 20, 2010 || Siding Spring || SSS ||  || align=right | 4.1 km || 
|-id=966 bgcolor=#d6d6d6
| 575966 ||  || — || January 3, 2012 || Kitt Peak || Spacewatch ||  || align=right | 2.2 km || 
|-id=967 bgcolor=#fefefe
| 575967 ||  || — || December 31, 2011 || Kitt Peak || Spacewatch ||  || align=right data-sort-value="0.90" | 900 m || 
|-id=968 bgcolor=#C2FFFF
| 575968 ||  || — || December 11, 2012 || Kitt Peak || Spacewatch || L4 || align=right | 9.4 km || 
|-id=969 bgcolor=#fefefe
| 575969 ||  || — || July 30, 2014 || Haleakala || Pan-STARRS ||  || align=right data-sort-value="0.67" | 670 m || 
|-id=970 bgcolor=#d6d6d6
| 575970 ||  || — || January 1, 2012 || Mount Lemmon || Mount Lemmon Survey || Tj (2.99) || align=right | 2.6 km || 
|-id=971 bgcolor=#d6d6d6
| 575971 ||  || — || July 25, 2014 || Haleakala || Pan-STARRS ||  || align=right | 3.4 km || 
|-id=972 bgcolor=#fefefe
| 575972 ||  || — || September 14, 2014 || Mount Lemmon || Mount Lemmon Survey ||  || align=right data-sort-value="0.78" | 780 m || 
|-id=973 bgcolor=#fefefe
| 575973 ||  || — || July 25, 2014 || Haleakala || Pan-STARRS ||  || align=right data-sort-value="0.62" | 620 m || 
|-id=974 bgcolor=#fefefe
| 575974 ||  || — || January 1, 2012 || Mount Lemmon || Mount Lemmon Survey ||  || align=right data-sort-value="0.45" | 450 m || 
|-id=975 bgcolor=#d6d6d6
| 575975 ||  || — || January 3, 2012 || Mount Lemmon || Mount Lemmon Survey ||  || align=right | 2.5 km || 
|-id=976 bgcolor=#d6d6d6
| 575976 ||  || — || January 1, 2012 || Mount Lemmon || Mount Lemmon Survey ||  || align=right | 2.0 km || 
|-id=977 bgcolor=#E9E9E9
| 575977 ||  || — || January 2, 2012 || Mount Lemmon || Mount Lemmon Survey ||  || align=right | 1.2 km || 
|-id=978 bgcolor=#E9E9E9
| 575978 ||  || — || January 2, 2012 || Kitt Peak || Spacewatch ||  || align=right data-sort-value="0.94" | 940 m || 
|-id=979 bgcolor=#fefefe
| 575979 ||  || — || January 1, 2012 || Mount Lemmon || Mount Lemmon Survey ||  || align=right data-sort-value="0.88" | 880 m || 
|-id=980 bgcolor=#fefefe
| 575980 ||  || — || November 2, 2007 || Mount Lemmon || Mount Lemmon Survey ||  || align=right data-sort-value="0.78" | 780 m || 
|-id=981 bgcolor=#fefefe
| 575981 ||  || — || August 28, 2000 || Cerro Tololo || R. Millis, L. H. Wasserman ||  || align=right data-sort-value="0.64" | 640 m || 
|-id=982 bgcolor=#fefefe
| 575982 ||  || — || April 30, 2005 || Kitt Peak || Spacewatch ||  || align=right data-sort-value="0.72" | 720 m || 
|-id=983 bgcolor=#d6d6d6
| 575983 ||  || — || October 2, 1999 || Kitt Peak || Spacewatch ||  || align=right | 2.1 km || 
|-id=984 bgcolor=#d6d6d6
| 575984 ||  || — || December 29, 2011 || Kitt Peak || Spacewatch ||  || align=right | 2.6 km || 
|-id=985 bgcolor=#fefefe
| 575985 ||  || — || January 19, 2012 || Socorro || LINEAR ||  || align=right data-sort-value="0.95" | 950 m || 
|-id=986 bgcolor=#fefefe
| 575986 ||  || — || February 4, 2005 || Catalina || CSS || PHO || align=right | 1.0 km || 
|-id=987 bgcolor=#E9E9E9
| 575987 ||  || — || January 19, 2012 || Haleakala || Pan-STARRS ||  || align=right | 1.5 km || 
|-id=988 bgcolor=#fefefe
| 575988 ||  || — || January 21, 2012 || Catalina || CSS || H || align=right data-sort-value="0.78" | 780 m || 
|-id=989 bgcolor=#fefefe
| 575989 ||  || — || January 2, 2012 || Mount Lemmon || Mount Lemmon Survey || H || align=right data-sort-value="0.63" | 630 m || 
|-id=990 bgcolor=#C2FFFF
| 575990 ||  || — || September 7, 2008 || Mount Lemmon || Mount Lemmon Survey || L4 || align=right | 7.3 km || 
|-id=991 bgcolor=#d6d6d6
| 575991 ||  || — || January 3, 2012 || Kitt Peak || Spacewatch ||  || align=right | 2.4 km || 
|-id=992 bgcolor=#d6d6d6
| 575992 ||  || — || December 21, 2006 || Kitt Peak || L. H. Wasserman || EOS || align=right | 1.9 km || 
|-id=993 bgcolor=#d6d6d6
| 575993 ||  || — || September 12, 2004 || Kitt Peak || Spacewatch ||  || align=right | 3.5 km || 
|-id=994 bgcolor=#d6d6d6
| 575994 ||  || — || December 26, 2011 || Mount Lemmon || Mount Lemmon Survey ||  || align=right | 2.8 km || 
|-id=995 bgcolor=#fefefe
| 575995 ||  || — || September 12, 2007 || Kitt Peak || Spacewatch ||  || align=right data-sort-value="0.54" | 540 m || 
|-id=996 bgcolor=#fefefe
| 575996 ||  || — || January 2, 2012 || Kitt Peak || Spacewatch ||  || align=right data-sort-value="0.59" | 590 m || 
|-id=997 bgcolor=#d6d6d6
| 575997 ||  || — || December 27, 2011 || Mount Lemmon || Mount Lemmon Survey ||  || align=right | 2.6 km || 
|-id=998 bgcolor=#fefefe
| 575998 ||  || — || January 20, 2012 || Mount Lemmon || Mount Lemmon Survey ||  || align=right data-sort-value="0.75" | 750 m || 
|-id=999 bgcolor=#fefefe
| 575999 ||  || — || December 4, 2007 || Mount Lemmon || Mount Lemmon Survey ||  || align=right data-sort-value="0.64" | 640 m || 
|-id=000 bgcolor=#FA8072
| 576000 ||  || — || January 19, 2005 || Kitt Peak || Spacewatch ||  || align=right data-sort-value="0.68" | 680 m || 
|}

References

External links 
 Discovery Circumstances: Numbered Minor Planets (575001)–(580000) (IAU Minor Planet Center)

0575